This is a partial list of unnumbered minor planets for principal provisional designations assigned between 16 November and 15 December 2004. , a total of 461 bodies remain unnumbered for this period. Objects for this year are listed on the following pages: A–B · C · D–E · F · G–H · J–O · P–Q · Ri · Rii · Riii · S · Ti · Tii · Tiii · Tiv · U–V · W–X and Y. Also see previous and next year.

W 

|- id="2004 WQ" bgcolor=#E9E9E9
| 0 || 2004 WQ || MBA-M || 17.01 || 1.7 km || multiple || 2003–2022 || 07 Jan 2022 || 220 || align=left | Disc.: SSS || 
|- id="2004 WC1" bgcolor=#FFC2E0
| 7 ||  || ATE || 26.1 || data-sort-value="0.021" | 21 m || single || 4 days || 22 Nov 2004 || 14 || align=left | Disc.: LONEOS || 
|- id="2004 WH1" bgcolor=#FFC2E0
| 8 ||  || APO || 24.0 || data-sort-value="0.056" | 56 m || single || 2 days || 20 Nov 2004 || 15 || align=left | Disc.: LONEOS || 
|- id="2004 WJ1" bgcolor=#fefefe
| 0 ||  || MBA-I || 17.40 || data-sort-value="0.98" | 980 m || multiple || 2004–2021 || 03 Oct 2021 || 84 || align=left | Disc.: CINEOS || 
|- id="2004 WK1" bgcolor=#FFC2E0
| 0 ||  || APO || 21.10 || data-sort-value="0.21" | 210 m || multiple || 2004–2021 || 27 Nov 2021 || 44 || align=left | Disc.: LINEARPotentially hazardous object || 
|- id="2004 WA2" bgcolor=#d6d6d6
| 0 ||  || MBA-O || 17.43 || 1.8 km || multiple || 2004–2021 || 01 Dec 2021 || 55 || align=left | Disc.: CINEOSAlt.: 2015 UK58 || 
|- id="2004 WU2" bgcolor=#E9E9E9
| 0 ||  || MBA-M || 17.08 || 2.1 km || multiple || 2004–2021 || 30 Jun 2021 || 122 || align=left | Disc.: SSS || 
|- id="2004 WV2" bgcolor=#E9E9E9
| 0 ||  || MBA-M || 17.51 || 1.3 km || multiple || 2004–2022 || 06 Jan 2022 || 80 || align=left | Disc.: SSSAdded on 5 November 2021 || 
|- id="2004 WW3" bgcolor=#fefefe
| 0 ||  || MBA-I || 18.4 || data-sort-value="0.62" | 620 m || multiple || 2000–2020 || 22 Mar 2020 || 70 || align=left | Disc.: CINEOS || 
|- id="2004 WD4" bgcolor=#fefefe
| 0 ||  || MBA-I || 18.73 || data-sort-value="0.53" | 530 m || multiple || 2004–2021 || 29 Dec 2021 || 132 || align=left | Disc.: CINEOS || 
|- id="2004 WT4" bgcolor=#fefefe
| 0 ||  || MBA-I || 17.68 || data-sort-value="0.87" | 870 m || multiple || 2004–2021 || 14 Apr 2021 || 138 || align=left | Disc.: CINEOSAlt.: 2008 XD21, 2017 AY10 || 
|- id="2004 WL5" bgcolor=#E9E9E9
| 3 ||  || MBA-M || 18.9 || data-sort-value="0.92" | 920 m || multiple || 2004–2013 || 07 Dec 2013 || 20 || align=left | Disc.: Spacewatch || 
|- id="2004 WW5" bgcolor=#d6d6d6
| 0 ||  || MBA-O || 17.1 || 2.1 km || multiple || 2004–2021 || 17 Jan 2021 || 99 || align=left | Disc.: SpacewatchAlt.: 2016 CV2 || 
|- id="2004 WC6" bgcolor=#FA8072
| 1 ||  || MCA || 18.2 || data-sort-value="0.68" | 680 m || multiple || 2004–2018 || 12 Dec 2018 || 96 || align=left | Disc.: LINEAR || 
|- id="2004 WE7" bgcolor=#E9E9E9
| 1 ||  || MBA-M || 17.4 || 1.8 km || multiple || 1996–2020 || 27 Apr 2020 || 39 || align=left | Disc.: LINEAR || 
|- id="2004 WQ7" bgcolor=#d6d6d6
| 0 ||  || MBA-O || 17.1 || 2.1 km || multiple || 2004–2021 || 14 Jan 2021 || 119 || align=left | Disc.: LINEARAlt.: 2011 CC99, 2016 AY26 || 
|- id="2004 WX11" bgcolor=#E9E9E9
| 1 ||  || MBA-M || 18.0 || 1.4 km || multiple || 2004–2019 || 07 Jan 2019 || 57 || align=left | Disc.: CINEOSAlt.: 2018 XY14 || 
|- id="2004 WZ12" bgcolor=#fefefe
| 0 ||  || MBA-I || 18.0 || data-sort-value="0.75" | 750 m || multiple || 2004–2020 || 08 Nov 2020 || 130 || align=left | Disc.: CINEOS || 
|- id="2004 WA13" bgcolor=#fefefe
| 0 ||  || MBA-I || 18.1 || data-sort-value="0.71" | 710 m || multiple || 1996–2020 || 10 Sep 2020 || 114 || align=left | Disc.: Spacewatch || 
|- id="2004 WC13" bgcolor=#E9E9E9
| 0 ||  || MBA-M || 17.2 || 2.0 km || multiple || 2004–2019 || 04 Feb 2019 || 63 || align=left | Disc.: Spacewatch || 
|- id="2004 WE13" bgcolor=#E9E9E9
| 1 ||  || MBA-M || 17.47 || data-sort-value="0.95" | 950 m || multiple || 2004–2022 || 25 Jan 2022 || 45 || align=left | Disc.: Spacewatch || 
|- id="2004 WF13" bgcolor=#d6d6d6
| 0 ||  || MBA-O || 17.10 || 2.1 km || multiple || 2004–2022 || 25 Jan 2022 || 73 || align=left | Disc.: Spacewatch || 
|- id="2004 WG13" bgcolor=#E9E9E9
| 0 ||  || MBA-M || 17.97 || 1.1 km || multiple || 2004–2022 || 06 Jan 2022 || 59 || align=left | Disc.: Spacewatch || 
|- id="2004 WH13" bgcolor=#d6d6d6
| 0 ||  || MBA-O || 16.5 || 2.8 km || multiple || 2004–2021 || 08 Jan 2021 || 85 || align=left | Disc.: Spacewatch || 
|- id="2004 WK13" bgcolor=#fefefe
| 0 ||  || MBA-I || 18.84 || data-sort-value="0.51" | 510 m || multiple || 2004–2021 || 29 Oct 2021 || 44 || align=left | Disc.: Spacewatch || 
|- id="2004 WL13" bgcolor=#E9E9E9
| 0 ||  || MBA-M || 17.31 || 1.5 km || multiple || 2004–2021 || 30 Nov 2021 || 185 || align=left | Disc.: CINEOS || 
|- id="2004 WM13" bgcolor=#E9E9E9
| 2 ||  || MBA-M || 18.9 || data-sort-value="0.49" | 490 m || multiple || 2004–2020 || 16 Aug 2020 || 50 || align=left | Disc.: CINEOS || 
|- id="2004 WN13" bgcolor=#fefefe
| 0 ||  || MBA-I || 17.85 || data-sort-value="0.80" | 800 m || multiple || 2004–2021 || 06 Apr 2021 || 121 || align=left | Disc.: Spacewatch || 
|- id="2004 WP13" bgcolor=#fefefe
| 0 ||  || MBA-I || 17.78 || data-sort-value="0.83" | 830 m || multiple || 2004–2021 || 17 Apr 2021 || 97 || align=left | Disc.: Spacewatch || 
|- id="2004 WR13" bgcolor=#E9E9E9
| 0 ||  || MBA-M || 17.8 || 1.2 km || multiple || 2004–2019 || 27 May 2019 || 51 || align=left | Disc.: Spacewatch || 
|- id="2004 WS13" bgcolor=#E9E9E9
| 0 ||  || MBA-M || 17.32 || 1.0 km || multiple || 2004–2022 || 27 Jan 2022 || 101 || align=left | Disc.: LPL/Spacewatch II || 
|- id="2004 WT13" bgcolor=#d6d6d6
| 0 ||  || MBA-O || 17.0 || 2.2 km || multiple || 2004–2021 || 18 Jan 2021 || 51 || align=left | Disc.: Spacewatch || 
|- id="2004 WU13" bgcolor=#d6d6d6
| 1 ||  || MBA-O || 17.1 || 2.1 km || multiple || 2004–2019 || 19 Dec 2019 || 54 || align=left | Disc.: Spacewatch || 
|- id="2004 WV13" bgcolor=#E9E9E9
| 0 ||  || MBA-M || 17.5 || 1.8 km || multiple || 2004–2019 || 06 Jan 2019 || 44 || align=left | Disc.: SSS || 
|- id="2004 WW13" bgcolor=#fefefe
| 0 ||  || MBA-I || 18.2 || data-sort-value="0.68" | 680 m || multiple || 2004–2020 || 13 May 2020 || 59 || align=left | Disc.: Spacewatch || 
|- id="2004 WY13" bgcolor=#E9E9E9
| 0 ||  || MBA-M || 17.9 || 1.5 km || multiple || 2004–2017 || 12 Sep 2017 || 34 || align=left | Disc.: Spacewatch || 
|- id="2004 WZ13" bgcolor=#d6d6d6
| 0 ||  || MBA-O || 17.31 || 1.9 km || multiple || 2004–2021 || 14 May 2021 || 91 || align=left | Disc.: CINEOS || 
|- id="2004 WA14" bgcolor=#d6d6d6
| 0 ||  || MBA-O || 16.5 || 2.8 km || multiple || 2004–2021 || 08 Jan 2021 || 133 || align=left | Disc.: CSS || 
|- id="2004 WB14" bgcolor=#FA8072
| 3 ||  || HUN || 20.3 || data-sort-value="0.26" | 260 m || multiple || 2004–2020 || 01 Jan 2020 || 41 || align=left | Disc.: Spacewatch || 
|- id="2004 WD14" bgcolor=#E9E9E9
| 0 ||  || MBA-M || 17.91 || data-sort-value="0.78" | 780 m || multiple || 2004–2022 || 25 Jan 2022 || 52 || align=left | Disc.: SpacewatchAdded on 19 October 2020 || 
|- id="2004 WE14" bgcolor=#E9E9E9
| 0 ||  || MBA-M || 17.92 || 1.5 km || multiple || 2004–2021 || 10 Aug 2021 || 63 || align=left | Disc.: SpacewatchAdded on 19 October 2020 || 
|- id="2004 WH14" bgcolor=#d6d6d6
| 4 ||  || MBA-O || 17.9 || 1.5 km || multiple || 2004–2020 || 14 Feb 2020 || 31 || align=left | Disc.: SpacewatchAdded on 9 March 2021 || 
|- id="2004 WJ14" bgcolor=#d6d6d6
| 3 ||  || MBA-O || 17.4 || 1.8 km || multiple || 2004–2021 || 16 Jan 2021 || 30 || align=left | Disc.: SpacewatchAdded on 9 March 2021 || 
|- id="2004 WK14" bgcolor=#d6d6d6
| 0 ||  || MBA-O || 16.81 || 2.4 km || multiple || 2004–2022 || 06 Jan 2022 || 83 || align=left | Disc.: SpacewatchAdded on 21 August 2021 || 
|- id="2004 WM14" bgcolor=#fefefe
| 1 ||  || MBA-I || 18.5 || data-sort-value="0.59" | 590 m || multiple || 2004–2018 || 17 Aug 2018 || 30 || align=left | Disc.: CINEOSAdded on 5 November 2021 || 
|- id="2004 WN14" bgcolor=#fefefe
| 1 ||  || MBA-I || 18.73 || data-sort-value="0.53" | 530 m || multiple || 2004–2022 || 06 Jan 2022 || 28 || align=left | Disc.: SpacewatchAdded on 24 December 2021 || 
|}
back to top

X 

|- id="2004 XG" bgcolor=#FFC2E0
| 4 || 2004 XG || ATE || 24.1 || data-sort-value="0.054" | 54 m || multiple || 2004–2015 || 11 Jan 2015 || 86 || align=left | Disc.: CSS || 
|- id="2004 XJ" bgcolor=#FFC2E0
| 7 || 2004 XJ || ATE || 24.0 || data-sort-value="0.056" | 56 m || single || 14 days || 15 Dec 2004 || 75 || align=left | Disc.: LINEAR || 
|- id="2004 XK" bgcolor=#FFC2E0
| 7 || 2004 XK || APO || 26.0 || data-sort-value="0.022" | 22 m || single || 3 days || 04 Dec 2004 || 47 || align=left | Disc.: CSS || 
|- id="2004 XM" bgcolor=#E9E9E9
| 0 || 2004 XM || MBA-M || 16.38 || 2.2 km || multiple || 2004–2022 || 16 Jan 2022 || 204 || align=left | Disc.: CSS || 
|- id="2004 XN" bgcolor=#FA8072
| 2 || 2004 XN || MCA || 18.5 || 1.1 km || multiple || 2004–2014 || 04 Jan 2014 || 45 || align=left | Disc.: LONEOSAlt.: 2013 WK44 || 
|- id="2004 XO" bgcolor=#FFC2E0
| 6 || 2004 XO || APO || 21.6 || data-sort-value="0.17" | 170 m || single || 14 days || 15 Dec 2004 || 96 || align=left | Disc.: CSSPotentially hazardous object || 
|- id="2004 XH3" bgcolor=#FFC2E0
| 5 ||  || APO || 24.1 || data-sort-value="0.054" | 54 m || single || 6 days || 07 Dec 2004 || 24 || align=left | Disc.: LINEAR || 
|- id="2004 XK3" bgcolor=#FFC2E0
| 2 ||  || APO || 24.4 || data-sort-value="0.047" | 47 m || multiple || 2004–2008 || 06 Dec 2008 || 229 || align=left | Disc.: LONEOS || 
|- id="2004 XR3" bgcolor=#E9E9E9
| 2 ||  || MBA-M || 17.5 || 1.8 km || multiple || 2004–2019 || 31 Jan 2019 || 49 || align=left | Disc.: Cordell–Lorenz Obs.Alt.: 2010 CD72 || 
|- id="2004 XE4" bgcolor=#d6d6d6
| 0 ||  || MBA-O || 16.22 || 3.2 km || multiple || 2004–2022 || 25 Jan 2022 || 233 || align=left | Disc.: KLENOT || 
|- id="2004 XL4" bgcolor=#FFC2E0
| 6 ||  || AMO || 20.9 || data-sort-value="0.23" | 230 m || single || 40 days || 15 Jan 2005 || 44 || align=left | Disc.: LINEAR || 
|- id="2004 XX5" bgcolor=#FA8072
| 0 ||  || HUN || 17.93 || data-sort-value="0.77" | 770 m || multiple || 2004–2021 || 24 Nov 2021 || 257 || align=left | Disc.: Spacewatch || 
|- id="2004 XD6" bgcolor=#FFC2E0
| 6 ||  || APO || 22.3 || data-sort-value="0.12" | 120 m || single || 24 days || 01 Jan 2005 || 58 || align=left | Disc.: Spacewatch || 
|- id="2004 XE6" bgcolor=#FFC2E0
| 1 ||  || AMO || 19.5 || data-sort-value="0.45" | 450 m || multiple || 2004–2018 || 27 May 2018 || 138 || align=left | Disc.: LINEAR || 
|- id="2004 XK6" bgcolor=#E9E9E9
| 0 ||  || MBA-M || 16.82 || 1.8 km || multiple || 2004–2022 || 17 Jan 2022 || 234 || align=left | Disc.: LINEAR || 
|- id="2004 XX11" bgcolor=#d6d6d6
| 0 ||  || MBA-O || 16.25 || 3.1 km || multiple || 2004–2021 || 27 Dec 2021 || 211 || align=left | Disc.: LINEARAlt.: 2009 QQ59, 2015 VO139 || 
|- id="2004 XV12" bgcolor=#E9E9E9
| 0 ||  || MBA-M || 17.41 || 1.4 km || multiple || 2004–2021 || 02 Oct 2021 || 62 || align=left | Disc.: LINEAR || 
|- id="2004 XB14" bgcolor=#E9E9E9
| 0 ||  || MBA-M || 16.7 || 1.4 km || multiple || 2003–2021 || 07 Jan 2021 || 94 || align=left | Disc.: SpacewatchAlt.: 2015 PT59 || 
|- id="2004 XC14" bgcolor=#E9E9E9
| 0 ||  || MBA-M || 17.46 || 1.4 km || multiple || 1999–2021 || 08 Nov 2021 || 163 || align=left | Disc.: SpacewatchAlt.: 2008 TF92, 2012 MP10 || 
|- id="2004 XJ14" bgcolor=#FA8072
| – ||  || MCA || 20.4 || data-sort-value="0.25" | 250 m || single || 10 days || 20 Dec 2004 || 43 || align=left | Disc.: LINEAR || 
|- id="2004 XK14" bgcolor=#FFC2E0
| 3 ||  || ATE || 22.4 || data-sort-value="0.240" | 240 m || multiple || 2004–2017 || 23 Nov 2017 || 137 || align=left | Disc.: LINEAR || 
|- id="2004 XP14" bgcolor=#FFC2E0
| 0 ||  || APO || 19.4 || data-sort-value="0.47" | 470 m || multiple || 2004–2020 || 12 Oct 2020 || 1362 || align=left | Disc.: LINEARPotentially hazardous object || 
|- id="2004 XC16" bgcolor=#E9E9E9
| 0 ||  || MBA-M || 18.07 || 1.0 km || multiple || 2004–2022 || 07 Jan 2022 || 61 || align=left | Disc.: Spacewatch || 
|- id="2004 XZ16" bgcolor=#fefefe
| 0 ||  || MBA-I || 17.93 || data-sort-value="0.77" | 770 m || multiple || 2004–2021 || 09 May 2021 || 91 || align=left | Disc.: LPL/Spacewatch II || 
|- id="2004 XR17" bgcolor=#d6d6d6
| 0 ||  || MBA-O || 16.6 || 2.7 km || multiple || 2001–2021 || 17 Jan 2021 || 156 || align=left | Disc.: SpacewatchAlt.: 2010 BP67 || 
|- id="2004 XH18" bgcolor=#d6d6d6
| 0 ||  || MBA-O || 17.12 || 2.1 km || multiple || 2004–2021 || 10 May 2021 || 98 || align=left | Disc.: LINEARAlt.: 2009 XT23 || 
|- id="2004 XZ18" bgcolor=#E9E9E9
| 0 ||  || MBA-M || 17.53 || 1.3 km || multiple || 2004–2022 || 17 Jan 2022 || 176 || align=left | Disc.: LINEAR || 
|- id="2004 XJ22" bgcolor=#d6d6d6
| 1 ||  || MBA-O || 17.2 || 2.6 km || multiple || 1999–2020 || 31 Jan 2020 || 95 || align=left | Disc.: LINEARAlt.: 1999 VF178 || 
|- id="2004 XS24" bgcolor=#E9E9E9
| 0 ||  || MBA-M || 16.9 || 2.3 km || multiple || 2004–2020 || 21 May 2020 || 44 || align=left | Disc.: CSS || 
|- id="2004 XG29" bgcolor=#FFC2E0
| 2 ||  || APO || 25.3 || data-sort-value="0.031" | 31 m || single || 36 days || 15 Jan 2005 || 110 || align=left | Disc.: LINEAR || 
|- id="2004 XJ29" bgcolor=#FFC2E0
| 0 ||  || APO || 21.38 || data-sort-value="0.19" | 190 m || multiple || 2004–2022 || 26 Jan 2022 || 226 || align=left | Disc.: CSS || 
|- id="2004 XK29" bgcolor=#FFC2E0
| 1 ||  || APO || 19.7 || data-sort-value="0.41" | 410 m || multiple || 2004–2020 || 31 Jan 2020 || 135 || align=left | Disc.: CSS || 
|- id="2004 XL29" bgcolor=#FFC2E0
| 0 ||  || APO || 19.04 || data-sort-value="0.55" | 550 m || multiple || 2004–2021 || 08 Jun 2021 || 102 || align=left | Disc.: Spacewatch || 
|- id="2004 XM29" bgcolor=#FFC2E0
| 1 ||  || APO || 22.9 || data-sort-value="0.093" | 93 m || multiple || 2004–2008 || 01 Jun 2008 || 134 || align=left | Disc.: Spacewatch || 
|- id="2004 XN29" bgcolor=#FFC2E0
| 6 ||  || APO || 22.0 || data-sort-value="0.14" | 140 m || single || 27 days || 07 Jan 2005 || 64 || align=left | Disc.: CSSPotentially hazardous object || 
|- id="2004 XO29" bgcolor=#FFC2E0
| 3 ||  || APO || 21.1 || data-sort-value="0.21" | 210 m || multiple || 2004–2019 || 19 Dec 2019 || 59 || align=left | Disc.: Spacewatch || 
|- id="2004 XP29" bgcolor=#FA8072
| 1 ||  || MCA || 17.8 || data-sort-value="0.82" | 820 m || multiple || 2001–2020 || 28 Jun 2020 || 64 || align=left | Disc.: CSS || 
|- id="2004 XU29" bgcolor=#E9E9E9
| 0 ||  || MBA-M || 16.5 || 2.8 km || multiple || 2004–2020 || 17 Mar 2020 || 50 || align=left | Disc.: LINEARAdded on 22 July 2020Alt.: 2015 FM367 || 
|- id="2004 XT30" bgcolor=#FA8072
| 0 ||  || MCA || 17.4 || data-sort-value="0.98" | 980 m || multiple || 2001–2018 || 05 Jun 2018 || 51 || align=left | Disc.: George Obs. || 
|- id="2004 XV33" bgcolor=#fefefe
| 0 ||  || MBA-I || 18.3 || data-sort-value="0.65" | 650 m || multiple || 2000–2019 || 03 Oct 2019 || 44 || align=left | Disc.: CINEOS || 
|- id="2004 XD34" bgcolor=#fefefe
| 0 ||  || MBA-I || 19.14 || data-sort-value="0.44" | 440 m || multiple || 2004–2021 || 02 Oct 2021 || 60 || align=left | Disc.: CINEOS || 
|- id="2004 XF35" bgcolor=#FA8072
| – ||  || MCA || 18.8 || data-sort-value="0.73" | 730 m || single || 31 days || 11 Jan 2005 || 30 || align=left | Disc.: LINEAR || 
|- id="2004 XH35" bgcolor=#FA8072
| E ||  || MCA || 19.3 || data-sort-value="0.41" | 410 m || single || 1 day || 13 Dec 2004 || 13 || align=left | Disc.: LINEAR || 
|- id="2004 XJ35" bgcolor=#FFC2E0
| 2 ||  || AMO || 20.3 || data-sort-value="0.31" | 310 m || multiple || 2004–2007 || 16 Dec 2007 || 86 || align=left | Disc.: Spacewatch || 
|- id="2004 XO35" bgcolor=#FFC2E0
| 7 ||  || AMO || 21.8 || data-sort-value="0.16" | 160 m || single || 19 days || 31 Dec 2004 || 25 || align=left | Disc.: LINEAR || 
|- id="2004 XP35" bgcolor=#FFC2E0
| 6 ||  || APO || 23.4 || data-sort-value="0.074" | 74 m || single || 22 days || 02 Jan 2005 || 113 || align=left | Disc.: Spacewatch || 
|- id="2004 XS35" bgcolor=#E9E9E9
| 0 ||  || MBA-M || 17.5 || 1.3 km || multiple || 2004–2021 || 30 Nov 2021 || 46 || align=left | Disc.: LINEARAdded on 21 August 2021 || 
|- id="2004 XB36" bgcolor=#d6d6d6
| 0 ||  || MBA-O || 17.48 || 1.8 km || multiple || 2004–2022 || 26 Jan 2022 || 53 || align=left | Disc.: Spacewatch || 
|- id="2004 XR36" bgcolor=#d6d6d6
| 0 ||  || MBA-O || 17.7 || 1.6 km || multiple || 2004–2021 || 12 Jan 2021 || 54 || align=left | Disc.: CINEOSAlt.: 2009 WQ227, 2010 CN205 || 
|- id="2004 XT36" bgcolor=#d6d6d6
| 0 ||  || MBA-O || 17.30 || 1.9 km || multiple || 2003–2021 || 08 May 2021 || 102 || align=left | Disc.: CINEOSAlt.: 2013 ST30 || 
|- id="2004 XG37" bgcolor=#fefefe
| 1 ||  || MBA-I || 18.3 || data-sort-value="0.65" | 650 m || multiple || 2004–2019 || 28 Dec 2019 || 77 || align=left | Disc.: CINEOS || 
|- id="2004 XL37" bgcolor=#d6d6d6
| 0 ||  || MBA-O || 16.39 || 2.9 km || multiple || 2000–2021 || 22 Nov 2021 || 107 || align=left | Disc.: CINEOSAdded on 19 October 2020 || 
|- id="2004 XH39" bgcolor=#E9E9E9
| 0 ||  || MBA-M || 17.57 || 1.3 km || multiple || 2004–2021 || 25 Nov 2021 || 169 || align=left | Disc.: LINEARAdded on 30 September 2021 || 
|- id="2004 XY41" bgcolor=#E9E9E9
| 0 ||  || MBA-M || 16.8 || 1.3 km || multiple || 2003–2020 || 15 Dec 2020 || 100 || align=left | Disc.: SpacewatchAlt.: 2014 MJ35 || 
|- id="2004 XS42" bgcolor=#fefefe
| 0 ||  || MBA-I || 18.5 || data-sort-value="0.59" | 590 m || multiple || 2004–2020 || 19 May 2020 || 77 || align=left | Disc.: LINEARAlt.: 2011 UR179 || 
|- id="2004 XF44" bgcolor=#E9E9E9
| 0 ||  || MBA-M || 16.8 || 2.4 km || multiple || 2004–2021 || 12 Jun 2021 || 69 || align=left | Disc.: CINEOSAdded on 21 August 2021Alt.: 2008 QV34, 2015 DS288 || 
|- id="2004 XL44" bgcolor=#FA8072
| – ||  || MCA || 19.2 || data-sort-value="0.43" | 430 m || single || 2 days || 14 Dec 2004 || 8 || align=left | Disc.: Mauna Kea Obs. || 
|- id="2004 XM44" bgcolor=#FA8072
| E ||  || MCA || 19.8 || data-sort-value="0.33" | 330 m || single || 2 days || 14 Dec 2004 || 9 || align=left | Disc.: Mauna Kea Obs. || 
|- id="2004 XX44" bgcolor=#FA8072
| E ||  || MCA || 18.8 || data-sort-value="0.52" | 520 m || single || 2 days || 14 Dec 2004 || 12 || align=left | Disc.: Mauna Kea Obs. || 
|- id="2004 XY44" bgcolor=#FA8072
| 2 ||  || MCA || 18.9 || data-sort-value="0.49" | 490 m || multiple || 2001–2017 || 13 Nov 2017 || 66 || align=left | Disc.: Mauna Kea Obs.Alt.: 2014 SK206 || 
|- id="2004 XZ44" bgcolor=#FA8072
| 4 ||  || MCA || 18.8 || data-sort-value="0.52" | 520 m || multiple || 2004–2020 || 21 Apr 2020 || 33 || align=left | Disc.: Mauna Kea Obs.Alt.: 2020 FQ5 || 
|- id="2004 XA45" bgcolor=#FFC2E0
| 0 ||  || APO || 21.0 || data-sort-value="0.22" | 220 m || multiple || 2004–2008 || 22 Oct 2008 || 44 || align=left | Disc.: Mauna Kea Obs. || 
|- id="2004 XB45" bgcolor=#FFC2E0
| 5 ||  || APO || 26.2 || data-sort-value="0.020" | 20 m || single || 4 days || 16 Dec 2004 || 45 || align=left | Disc.: Spacewatch || 
|- id="2004 XR45" bgcolor=#E9E9E9
| 3 ||  || MBA-M || 17.5 || data-sort-value="0.94" | 940 m || multiple || 2004–2021 || 11 Jan 2021 || 50 || align=left | Disc.: SpacewatchAdded on 9 March 2021 || 
|- id="2004 XC47" bgcolor=#d6d6d6
| 0 ||  || MBA-O || 17.11 || 2.1 km || multiple || 2004–2021 || 05 Jul 2021 || 125 || align=left | Disc.: SpacewatchAlt.: 2015 BG394 || 
|- id="2004 XC48" bgcolor=#E9E9E9
| 0 ||  || MBA-M || 17.0 || 1.2 km || multiple || 1999–2021 || 07 Jan 2021 || 122 || align=left | Disc.: SpacewatchAlt.: 2007 QZ10 || 
|- id="2004 XQ48" bgcolor=#d6d6d6
| 0 ||  || MBA-O || 16.34 || 3.0 km || multiple || 2004–2022 || 06 Jan 2022 || 142 || align=left | Disc.: SpacewatchAlt.: 2010 BN119 || 
|- id="2004 XE50" bgcolor=#fefefe
| 0 ||  || MBA-I || 17.63 || data-sort-value="0.89" | 890 m || multiple || 2004–2021 || 28 Nov 2021 || 86 || align=left | Disc.: Spacewatch || 
|- id="2004 XF50" bgcolor=#fefefe
| 0 ||  || MBA-I || 17.87 || data-sort-value="0.79" | 790 m || multiple || 2004–2021 || 11 May 2021 || 92 || align=left | Disc.: Calvin-RehobothAlt.: 2015 TL271 || 
|- id="2004 XH50" bgcolor=#FFE699
| 1 ||  || Asteroid || 16.5 || 2.8 km || multiple || 2004–2017 || 03 Jan 2017 || 85 || align=left | Disc.: CINEOSMCA at MPC || 
|- id="2004 XJ50" bgcolor=#FFC2E0
| 0 ||  || AMO || 19.27 || data-sort-value="0.50" | 500 m || multiple || 2004–2022 || 27 Jan 2022 || 86 || align=left | Disc.: LONEOS || 
|- id="2004 XC51" bgcolor=#FFC2E0
| 8 ||  || APO || 19.9 || data-sort-value="0.37" | 370 m || single || 9 days || 23 Dec 2004 || 45 || align=left | Disc.: LINEAR || 
|- id="2004 XD51" bgcolor=#FFC2E0
| 7 ||  || APO || 25.0 || data-sort-value="0.036" | 36 m || single || 5 days || 19 Dec 2004 || 33 || align=left | Disc.: LINEAR || 
|- id="2004 XF51" bgcolor=#E9E9E9
| 3 ||  || MBA-M || 17.6 || data-sort-value="0.90" | 900 m || multiple || 2004–2021 || 19 Jan 2021 || 81 || align=left | Disc.: SpacewatchAlt.: 2008 WA84 || 
|- id="2004 XX51" bgcolor=#E9E9E9
| 2 ||  || MBA-M || 17.8 || data-sort-value="0.82" | 820 m || multiple || 2004–2021 || 10 Jan 2021 || 138 || align=left | Disc.: CINEOSAlt.: 2008 VL78, 2012 XJ72 || 
|- id="2004 XM52" bgcolor=#d6d6d6
| 0 ||  || MBA-O || 16.0 || 3.5 km || multiple || 2004–2021 || 11 Jan 2021 || 157 || align=left | Disc.: SpacewatchAlt.: 2017 FJ146 || 
|- id="2004 XQ52" bgcolor=#d6d6d6
| 0 ||  || HIL || 16.1 || 3.4 km || multiple || 2004–2021 || 18 Jan 2021 || 74 || align=left | Disc.: SpacewatchAdded on 22 July 2020Alt.: 2012 XN93 || 
|- id="2004 XV52" bgcolor=#E9E9E9
| 0 ||  || MBA-M || 17.87 || 1.1 km || multiple || 2004–2021 || 06 Nov 2021 || 101 || align=left | Disc.: Spacewatch || 
|- id="2004 XY52" bgcolor=#fefefe
| 0 ||  || MBA-I || 18.7 || data-sort-value="0.54" | 540 m || multiple || 2002–2020 || 02 Feb 2020 || 57 || align=left | Disc.: SpacewatchAdded on 22 July 2020Alt.: 2011 SR262 || 
|- id="2004 XZ52" bgcolor=#E9E9E9
| 0 ||  || MBA-M || 16.95 || 1.2 km || multiple || 2003–2022 || 24 Jan 2022 || 216 || align=left | Disc.: SpacewatchAlt.: 2008 WO119 || 
|- id="2004 XR53" bgcolor=#d6d6d6
| 0 ||  || MBA-O || 16.59 || 2.7 km || multiple || 2003–2021 || 09 Dec 2021 || 126 || align=left | Disc.: SpacewatchAdded on 19 October 2020Alt.: 2015 XH3 || 
|- id="2004 XS53" bgcolor=#d6d6d6
| 2 ||  || MBA-O || 17.0 || 2.2 km || multiple || 2004–2021 || 04 Jan 2021 || 40 || align=left | Disc.: SpacewatchAdded on 17 June 2021Alt.: 2010 BG127, 2020 WU9 || 
|- id="2004 XZ53" bgcolor=#fefefe
| 2 ||  || MBA-I || 17.9 || data-sort-value="0.78" | 780 m || multiple || 1992–2021 || 10 Feb 2021 || 49 || align=left | Disc.: SpacewatchAdded on 9 March 2021Alt.: 2017 BW13, 2020 YE11 || 
|- id="2004 XP54" bgcolor=#d6d6d6
| 0 ||  || MBA-O || 17.4 || 1.8 km || multiple || 2004–2020 || 24 Dec 2020 || 115 || align=left | Disc.: SpacewatchAlt.: 2010 CV260 || 
|- id="2004 XF55" bgcolor=#fefefe
| 0 ||  || MBA-I || 18.70 || data-sort-value="0.54" | 540 m || multiple || 2004–2021 || 10 Aug 2021 || 66 || align=left | Disc.: Spacewatch || 
|- id="2004 XL55" bgcolor=#E9E9E9
| 0 ||  || MBA-M || 17.81 || 1.2 km || multiple || 2004–2022 || 12 Jan 2022 || 80 || align=left | Disc.: SpacewatchAlt.: 2012 TC145 || 
|- id="2004 XN55" bgcolor=#E9E9E9
| 0 ||  || MBA-M || 17.54 || 1.3 km || multiple || 1999–2022 || 27 Jan 2022 || 73 || align=left | Disc.: Spacewatch || 
|- id="2004 XW55" bgcolor=#E9E9E9
| 0 ||  || MBA-M || 17.37 || 1.4 km || multiple || 2001–2021 || 09 Nov 2021 || 111 || align=left | Disc.: SpacewatchAlt.: 2014 AV42 || 
|- id="2004 XX55" bgcolor=#d6d6d6
| 0 ||  || MBA-O || 16.2 || 3.2 km || multiple || 2004–2021 || 17 Jan 2021 || 147 || align=left | Disc.: SpacewatchAlt.: 2014 WZ499 || 
|- id="2004 XG57" bgcolor=#fefefe
| 0 ||  || MBA-I || 17.25 || 1.1 km || multiple || 2000–2021 || 09 Nov 2021 || 219 || align=left | Disc.: SpacewatchAlt.: 2014 SM339 || 
|- id="2004 XC58" bgcolor=#E9E9E9
| 0 ||  || MBA-M || 17.13 || 1.1 km || multiple || 2004–2022 || 15 Jan 2022 || 85 || align=left | Disc.: Spacewatch || 
|- id="2004 XL58" bgcolor=#E9E9E9
| 0 ||  || MBA-M || 17.39 || 1.4 km || multiple || 2004–2022 || 27 Jan 2022 || 41 || align=left | Disc.: Spacewatch || 
|- id="2004 XV58" bgcolor=#E9E9E9
| 0 ||  || MBA-M || 16.8 || 1.3 km || multiple || 2004–2021 || 09 Jan 2021 || 94 || align=left | Disc.: Spacewatch || 
|- id="2004 XE59" bgcolor=#E9E9E9
| 2 ||  || MBA-M || 17.8 || data-sort-value="0.82" | 820 m || multiple || 2004–2021 || 07 Jan 2021 || 45 || align=left | Disc.: Spacewatch || 
|- id="2004 XM59" bgcolor=#d6d6d6
| 0 ||  || MBA-O || 17.0 || 2.2 km || multiple || 2003–2020 || 27 Feb 2020 || 90 || align=left | Disc.: Spacewatch || 
|- id="2004 XO59" bgcolor=#fefefe
| 0 ||  || MBA-I || 17.2 || 1.1 km || multiple || 2004–2021 || 17 Jan 2021 || 97 || align=left | Disc.: Spacewatch || 
|- id="2004 XA60" bgcolor=#E9E9E9
| 0 ||  || MBA-M || 17.37 || 1.4 km || multiple || 2004–2021 || 07 Nov 2021 || 102 || align=left | Disc.: Spacewatch || 
|- id="2004 XD60" bgcolor=#d6d6d6
| 0 ||  || MBA-O || 17.21 || 2.0 km || multiple || 2004–2022 || 24 Jan 2022 || 45 || align=left | Disc.: SpacewatchAdded on 29 January 2022 || 
|- id="2004 XS60" bgcolor=#fefefe
| 0 ||  || MBA-I || 18.4 || data-sort-value="0.62" | 620 m || multiple || 2004–2020 || 05 Jan 2020 || 59 || align=left | Disc.: SpacewatchAlt.: 2015 TX254 || 
|- id="2004 XP61" bgcolor=#FA8072
| 1 ||  || MCA || 17.42 || 1.4 km || multiple || 2004–2021 || 16 Nov 2021 || 31 || align=left | Disc.: SpacewatchAdded on 9 March 2021Alt.: 2020 MG1 || 
|- id="2004 XP62" bgcolor=#d6d6d6
| 0 ||  || MBA-O || 16.9 || 2.3 km || multiple || 2003–2021 || 04 May 2021 || 130 || align=left | Disc.: Junk Bond Obs.Alt.: 2006 DH92 || 
|- id="2004 XO63" bgcolor=#FFC2E0
| 5 ||  || APO || 26.2 || data-sort-value="0.020" | 20 m || single || 6 days || 21 Dec 2004 || 37 || align=left | Disc.: LINEAR || 
|- id="2004 XU63" bgcolor=#E9E9E9
| 0 ||  || MBA-M || 18.84 || data-sort-value="0.51" | 510 m || multiple || 2004–2022 || 27 Jan 2022 || 27 || align=left | Disc.: Spacewatch || 
|- id="2004 XF64" bgcolor=#E9E9E9
| 0 ||  || MBA-M || 17.67 || 1.6 km || multiple || 2004–2021 || 09 Sep 2021 || 51 || align=left | Disc.: Spacewatch || 
|- id="2004 XX66" bgcolor=#d6d6d6
| 0 ||  || MBA-O || 17.02 || 2.2 km || multiple || 2004–2022 || 26 Jan 2022 || 59 || align=left | Disc.: LPL/Spacewatch II || 
|- id="2004 XF67" bgcolor=#d6d6d6
| 0 ||  || MBA-O || 15.99 || 3.5 km || multiple || 1995–2022 || 27 Jan 2022 || 204 || align=left | Disc.: SpacewatchAlt.: 2010 BL33, 2015 XX358, 2017 BM9 || 
|- id="2004 XH68" bgcolor=#E9E9E9
| 0 ||  || MBA-M || 17.02 || 1.7 km || multiple || 1999–2022 || 06 Jan 2022 || 236 || align=left | Disc.: SpacewatchAlt.: 2012 VJ33 || 
|- id="2004 XE70" bgcolor=#d6d6d6
| 0 ||  || MBA-O || 16.88 || 2.3 km || multiple || 2004–2021 || 10 May 2021 || 114 || align=left | Disc.: SpacewatchAlt.: 2011 FE3 || 
|- id="2004 XQ71" bgcolor=#E9E9E9
| 1 ||  || MBA-M || 18.62 || data-sort-value="0.79" | 790 m || multiple || 2004–2022 || 23 Jan 2022 || 43 || align=left | Disc.: LPL/Spacewatch II || 
|- id="2004 XT71" bgcolor=#d6d6d6
| 0 ||  || MBA-O || 17.66 || 1.6 km || multiple || 2004–2020 || 16 Apr 2020 || 45 || align=left | Disc.: LPL/Spacewatch IIAlt.: 2010 GR12 || 
|- id="2004 XX71" bgcolor=#E9E9E9
| 0 ||  || MBA-M || 17.17 || 1.1 km || multiple || 2003–2022 || 26 Jan 2022 || 104 || align=left | Disc.: LPL/Spacewatch II || 
|- id="2004 XN72" bgcolor=#fefefe
| 0 ||  || MBA-I || 18.97 || data-sort-value="0.48" | 480 m || multiple || 2004–2021 || 29 Sep 2021 || 52 || align=left | Disc.: LPL/Spacewatch IIAlt.: 2014 OV225 || 
|- id="2004 XF73" bgcolor=#fefefe
| 0 ||  || MBA-I || 17.57 || data-sort-value="0.91" | 910 m || multiple || 2004–2021 || 30 Jun 2021 || 46 || align=left | Disc.: NEAT || 
|- id="2004 XH74" bgcolor=#FA8072
| 3 ||  || MCA || 17.6 || data-sort-value="0.90" | 900 m || multiple || 2004–2021 || 18 Jan 2021 || 47 || align=left | Disc.: NEATAlt.: 2017 BB26 || 
|- id="2004 XT74" bgcolor=#d6d6d6
| 0 ||  || MBA-O || 16.9 || 2.3 km || multiple || 2004–2020 || 22 Oct 2020 || 41 || align=left | Disc.: Jarnac Obs. || 
|- id="2004 XT75" bgcolor=#d6d6d6
| 0 ||  || HIL || 15.32 || 4.8 km || multiple || 2003–2022 || 27 Jan 2022 || 146 || align=left | Disc.: SpacewatchAlt.: 2018 PS2 || 
|- id="2004 XN76" bgcolor=#d6d6d6
| 0 ||  || MBA-O || 16.8 || 2.4 km || multiple || 2004–2020 || 22 Jun 2020 || 71 || align=left | Disc.: SpacewatchAlt.: 2016 AV188 || 
|- id="2004 XB82" bgcolor=#E9E9E9
| – ||  || MBA-M || 18.8 || data-sort-value="0.52" | 520 m || single || 35 days || 16 Dec 2004 || 16 || align=left | Disc.: CINEOS || 
|- id="2004 XR82" bgcolor=#fefefe
| 1 ||  || MBA-I || 17.0 || 1.2 km || multiple || 2004–2019 || 30 Dec 2019 || 55 || align=left | Disc.: SpacewatchAlt.: 2015 XK308 || 
|- id="2004 XT85" bgcolor=#fefefe
| 4 ||  || MBA-I || 18.1 || data-sort-value="0.71" | 710 m || multiple || 2004–2007 || 16 Oct 2007 || 19 || align=left | Disc.: SpacewatchAlt.: 2007 UE125 || 
|- id="2004 XC87" bgcolor=#d6d6d6
| 1 ||  || MBA-O || 17.8 || 1.5 km || multiple || 2004–2021 || 11 Jan 2021 || 75 || align=left | Disc.: CSSAlt.: 2020 SA11 || 
|- id="2004 XF88" bgcolor=#E9E9E9
| 0 ||  || MBA-M || 17.89 || 1.1 km || multiple || 2004–2022 || 05 Jan 2022 || 122 || align=left | Disc.: Spacewatch || 
|- id="2004 XN88" bgcolor=#fefefe
| 0 ||  || MBA-I || 18.51 || data-sort-value="0.59" | 590 m || multiple || 2004–2021 || 04 Oct 2021 || 80 || align=left | Disc.: LINEAR || 
|- id="2004 XD89" bgcolor=#d6d6d6
| 1 ||  || MBA-O || 17.4 || 1.8 km || multiple || 2004–2020 || 16 Dec 2020 || 91 || align=left | Disc.: CINEOSAlt.: 2016 AU53 || 
|- id="2004 XV89" bgcolor=#d6d6d6
| 0 ||  || MBA-O || 16.7 || 2.5 km || multiple || 2004–2020 || 15 Dec 2020 || 58 || align=left | Disc.: SpacewatchAlt.: 2011 BT41, 2014 QZ31 || 
|- id="2004 XC90" bgcolor=#E9E9E9
| 2 ||  || MBA-M || 18.3 || data-sort-value="0.65" | 650 m || multiple || 2004–2021 || 16 Jan 2021 || 105 || align=left | Disc.: SpacewatchAlt.: 2008 WG73 || 
|- id="2004 XR90" bgcolor=#fefefe
| 0 ||  || MBA-I || 18.51 || data-sort-value="0.59" | 590 m || multiple || 2004–2021 || 09 Oct 2021 || 45 || align=left | Disc.: Spacewatch || 
|- id="2004 XC91" bgcolor=#d6d6d6
| 0 ||  || MBA-O || 16.62 || 2.6 km || multiple || 2004–2021 || 03 May 2021 || 108 || align=left | Disc.: Spacewatch || 
|- id="2004 XG91" bgcolor=#fefefe
| 0 ||  || MBA-I || 18.44 || data-sort-value="0.61" | 610 m || multiple || 2000–2021 || 15 Apr 2021 || 55 || align=left | Disc.: Spacewatch || 
|- id="2004 XH91" bgcolor=#d6d6d6
| 0 ||  || HIL || 15.3 || 4.8 km || multiple || 2004–2021 || 05 Jan 2021 || 121 || align=left | Disc.: SpacewatchAlt.: 2014 EX203 || 
|- id="2004 XR91" bgcolor=#d6d6d6
| 0 ||  || MBA-O || 16.55 || 2.7 km || multiple || 2004–2022 || 12 Jan 2022 || 187 || align=left | Disc.: SpacewatchAlt.: 2010 BL135, 2011 BC4 || 
|- id="2004 XT91" bgcolor=#E9E9E9
| 0 ||  || MBA-M || 17.73 || data-sort-value="0.85" | 850 m || multiple || 2004–2022 || 26 Jan 2022 || 86 || align=left | Disc.: SpacewatchAdded on 22 July 2020Alt.: 2007 MM23 || 
|- id="2004 XE93" bgcolor=#d6d6d6
| 0 ||  || MBA-O || 15.82 || 3.8 km || multiple || 2003–2022 || 25 Jan 2022 || 149 || align=left | Disc.: SpacewatchAlt.: 2011 CK68 || 
|- id="2004 XX94" bgcolor=#fefefe
| 0 ||  || MBA-I || 18.3 || data-sort-value="0.65" | 650 m || multiple || 2004–2020 || 14 Feb 2020 || 72 || align=left | Disc.: Spacewatch || 
|- id="2004 XM97" bgcolor=#fefefe
| 0 ||  || MBA-I || 18.23 || data-sort-value="0.67" | 670 m || multiple || 1995–2022 || 08 Jan 2022 || 136 || align=left | Disc.: SpacewatchAlt.: 2012 BT10 || 
|- id="2004 XP97" bgcolor=#d6d6d6
| 0 ||  || MBA-O || 16.7 || 2.5 km || multiple || 2004–2021 || 17 Jan 2021 || 91 || align=left | Disc.: SpacewatchAlt.: 2009 WV14 || 
|- id="2004 XT97" bgcolor=#d6d6d6
| 0 ||  || MBA-O || 16.88 || 2.3 km || multiple || 2003–2021 || 15 Apr 2021 || 110 || align=left | Disc.: Spacewatch || 
|- id="2004 XP98" bgcolor=#E9E9E9
| 0 ||  || MBA-M || 18.10 || 1.0 km || multiple || 2002–2022 || 27 Jan 2022 || 70 || align=left | Disc.: Spacewatch || 
|- id="2004 XF99" bgcolor=#d6d6d6
| 0 ||  || MBA-O || 16.65 || 2.6 km || multiple || 2004–2022 || 13 Jan 2022 || 79 || align=left | Disc.: Spacewatch || 
|- id="2004 XX99" bgcolor=#fefefe
| 0 ||  || MBA-I || 18.2 || data-sort-value="0.68" | 680 m || multiple || 2004–2018 || 02 Oct 2018 || 69 || align=left | Disc.: Spacewatch || 
|- id="2004 XH105" bgcolor=#d6d6d6
| 1 ||  || MBA-O || 16.6 || 3.2 km || multiple || 2004–2020 || 27 Feb 2020 || 200 || align=left | Disc.: LINEAR || 
|- id="2004 XK105" bgcolor=#d6d6d6
| 0 ||  || MBA-O || 15.55 || 4.3 km || multiple || 2004–2022 || 21 Jan 2022 || 189 || align=left | Disc.: LINEAR || 
|- id="2004 XO106" bgcolor=#E9E9E9
| 0 ||  || MBA-M || 17.56 || 1.7 km || multiple || 2004–2021 || 08 Jun 2021 || 95 || align=left | Disc.: LINEARAlt.: 2013 RZ79 || 
|- id="2004 XC108" bgcolor=#E9E9E9
| 0 ||  || MBA-M || 16.1 || 1.8 km || multiple || 2003–2021 || 19 Jan 2021 || 123 || align=left | Disc.: LINEAR || 
|- id="2004 XY110" bgcolor=#fefefe
| – ||  || MBA-I || 18.0 || data-sort-value="0.75" | 750 m || single || 23 days || 05 Jan 2005 || 14 || align=left | Disc.: CSS || 
|- id="2004 XZ111" bgcolor=#E9E9E9
| 0 ||  || MBA-M || 18.07 || 1.0 km || multiple || 2004–2021 || 08 Dec 2021 || 62 || align=left | Disc.: Spacewatch || 
|- id="2004 XC112" bgcolor=#fefefe
| 0 ||  || MBA-I || 18.1 || data-sort-value="0.71" | 710 m || multiple || 2004–2020 || 26 Jan 2020 || 51 || align=left | Disc.: SpacewatchAlt.: 2015 XN310 || 
|- id="2004 XO112" bgcolor=#E9E9E9
| 1 ||  || MBA-M || 16.9 || 2.3 km || multiple || 2004–2018 || 13 Dec 2018 || 37 || align=left | Disc.: SpacewatchAlt.: 2010 JK182 || 
|- id="2004 XE113" bgcolor=#fefefe
| 1 ||  || MBA-I || 18.4 || data-sort-value="0.62" | 620 m || multiple || 2003–2019 || 31 May 2019 || 62 || align=left | Disc.: Spacewatch || 
|- id="2004 XH113" bgcolor=#fefefe
| 0 ||  || MBA-I || 18.63 || data-sort-value="0.56" | 560 m || multiple || 1997–2021 || 30 Nov 2021 || 119 || align=left | Disc.: SpacewatchAlt.: 1997 UW16, 2014 RU37 || 
|- id="2004 XW113" bgcolor=#fefefe
| 0 ||  || MBA-I || 18.47 || data-sort-value="0.60" | 600 m || multiple || 2004–2022 || 06 Jan 2022 || 138 || align=left | Disc.: Spacewatch || 
|- id="2004 XD114" bgcolor=#E9E9E9
| 0 ||  || MBA-M || 17.87 || 1.1 km || multiple || 2004–2021 || 30 Nov 2021 || 70 || align=left | Disc.: SpacewatchAdded on 24 December 2021 || 
|- id="2004 XG114" bgcolor=#d6d6d6
| 0 ||  || MBA-O || 16.6 || 2.7 km || multiple || 2004–2020 || 10 Dec 2020 || 42 || align=left | Disc.: SpacewatchAdded on 17 January 2021 || 
|- id="2004 XH114" bgcolor=#E9E9E9
| 1 ||  || MBA-M || 17.3 || 1.9 km || multiple || 2004–2018 || 10 Dec 2018 || 46 || align=left | Disc.: Spacewatch || 
|- id="2004 XM115" bgcolor=#d6d6d6
| 0 ||  || MBA-O || 16.93 || 2.3 km || multiple || 2002–2021 || 15 Apr 2021 || 115 || align=left | Disc.: SpacewatchAlt.: 2011 FF136 || 
|- id="2004 XQ115" bgcolor=#E9E9E9
| 0 ||  || MBA-M || 17.9 || data-sort-value="0.78" | 780 m || multiple || 2004–2020 || 17 Dec 2020 || 89 || align=left | Disc.: SpacewatchAlt.: 2012 VK89, 2014 HW52 || 
|- id="2004 XU117" bgcolor=#E9E9E9
| 0 ||  || MBA-M || 16.8 || 1.3 km || multiple || 2001–2021 || 13 Jan 2021 || 176 || align=left | Disc.: SpacewatchAlt.: 2006 EU69, 2015 JK10 || 
|- id="2004 XP118" bgcolor=#E9E9E9
| 2 ||  || MBA-M || 18.3 || data-sort-value="0.65" | 650 m || multiple || 2004–2020 || 11 Nov 2020 || 31 || align=left | Disc.: SpacewatchAdded on 29 January 2022 || 
|- id="2004 XL119" bgcolor=#E9E9E9
| 0 ||  || MBA-M || 17.3 || 1.0 km || multiple || 2004–2021 || 08 Jan 2021 || 88 || align=left | Disc.: SpacewatchAlt.: 2014 KQ29 || 
|- id="2004 XF120" bgcolor=#d6d6d6
| 0 ||  || MBA-O || 17.0 || 2.2 km || multiple || 1999–2021 || 13 May 2021 || 89 || align=left | Disc.: SpacewatchAdded on 22 July 2020Alt.: 1999 XV227, 2016 GL131 || 
|- id="2004 XU121" bgcolor=#fefefe
| 0 ||  || MBA-I || 18.15 || data-sort-value="0.70" | 700 m || multiple || 2004–2021 || 09 May 2021 || 60 || align=left | Disc.: SpacewatchAlt.: 2011 SN14 || 
|- id="2004 XU122" bgcolor=#fefefe
| 1 ||  || MBA-I || 18.4 || data-sort-value="0.62" | 620 m || multiple || 2000–2020 || 02 Feb 2020 || 88 || align=left | Disc.: SpacewatchAlt.: 2016 AR186 || 
|- id="2004 XL125" bgcolor=#d6d6d6
| 0 ||  || MBA-O || 16.7 || 2.5 km || multiple || 2004–2021 || 18 Jan 2021 || 68 || align=left | Disc.: CSSAdded on 22 July 2020 || 
|- id="2004 XZ125" bgcolor=#E9E9E9
| 0 ||  || MBA-M || 16.6 || 1.4 km || multiple || 2004–2021 || 18 Jan 2021 || 155 || align=left | Disc.: CSS || 
|- id="2004 XL127" bgcolor=#E9E9E9
| 0 ||  || MBA-M || 17.05 || 1.2 km || multiple || 2004–2022 || 25 Jan 2022 || 130 || align=left | Disc.: LINEAR || 
|- id="2004 XS128" bgcolor=#E9E9E9
| 0 ||  || MBA-M || 16.94 || 1.7 km || multiple || 2004–2021 || 03 Dec 2021 || 135 || align=left | Disc.: LINEAR || 
|- id="2004 XC130" bgcolor=#d6d6d6
| 0 ||  || MBA-O || 15.84 || 3.8 km || multiple || 2004–2022 || 10 Jan 2022 || 128 || align=left | Disc.: LINEARAlt.: 2010 BP112, 2015 XE70 || 
|- id="2004 XF130" bgcolor=#d6d6d6
| 0 ||  || MBA-O || 16.43 || 2.9 km || multiple || 2004–2021 || 20 Apr 2021 || 138 || align=left | Disc.: LINEARAlt.: 2010 FK7 || 
|- id="2004 XF131" bgcolor=#fefefe
| 3 ||  || MBA-I || 18.8 || data-sort-value="0.52" | 520 m || multiple || 2004–2018 || 31 Dec 2018 || 17 || align=left | Disc.: Spacewatch || 
|- id="2004 XY131" bgcolor=#E9E9E9
| 0 ||  || MBA-M || 17.64 || 1.2 km || multiple || 2004–2022 || 21 Jan 2022 || 181 || align=left | Disc.: LINEAR || 
|- id="2004 XR133" bgcolor=#d6d6d6
| 0 ||  || MBA-O || 16.55 || 2.7 km || multiple || 2004–2022 || 26 Jan 2022 || 387 || align=left | Disc.: LINEAR || 
|- id="2004 XG135" bgcolor=#E9E9E9
| 0 ||  || MBA-M || 16.75 || 1.9 km || multiple || 2003–2022 || 22 Jan 2022 || 140 || align=left | Disc.: LINEAR || 
|- id="2004 XB137" bgcolor=#E9E9E9
| 0 ||  || MBA-M || 16.8 || 1.3 km || multiple || 2004–2021 || 09 Jan 2021 || 149 || align=left | Disc.: LINEAR || 
|- id="2004 XW137" bgcolor=#E9E9E9
| 3 ||  || MBA-M || 17.8 || 1.5 km || multiple || 2004–2019 || 04 Mar 2019 || 32 || align=left | Disc.: Spacewatch || 
|- id="2004 XD138" bgcolor=#d6d6d6
| 0 ||  || MBA-O || 16.18 || 3.2 km || multiple || 1995–2022 || 13 Jan 2022 || 147 || align=left | Disc.: SpacewatchAlt.: 2017 JO4 || 
|- id="2004 XL139" bgcolor=#fefefe
| 0 ||  || MBA-I || 17.81 || data-sort-value="0.81" | 810 m || multiple || 1996–2021 || 09 Apr 2021 || 159 || align=left | Disc.: SpacewatchAlt.: 2008 YN107, 2009 AP51 || 
|- id="2004 XP139" bgcolor=#fefefe
| 0 ||  || MBA-I || 17.56 || data-sort-value="0.91" | 910 m || multiple || 2004–2021 || 27 Nov 2021 || 169 || align=left | Disc.: SpacewatchAlt.: 2014 WP176 || 
|- id="2004 XV139" bgcolor=#E9E9E9
| 0 ||  || MBA-M || 17.4 || 1.8 km || multiple || 2004–2017 || 25 Nov 2017 || 69 || align=left | Disc.: Spacewatch || 
|- id="2004 XH140" bgcolor=#E9E9E9
| – ||  || MBA-M || 17.5 || data-sort-value="0.94" | 940 m || single || 33 days || 14 Jan 2005 || 11 || align=left | Disc.: Spacewatch || 
|- id="2004 XO140" bgcolor=#fefefe
| 0 ||  || MBA-I || 17.6 || data-sort-value="0.90" | 900 m || multiple || 2004–2020 || 22 Mar 2020 || 139 || align=left | Disc.: SpacewatchAlt.: 2014 OC207, 2016 BN21, 2018 SO5 || 
|- id="2004 XV140" bgcolor=#d6d6d6
| 0 ||  || MBA-O || 16.12 || 3.3 km || multiple || 2003–2022 || 27 Jan 2022 || 137 || align=left | Disc.: SpacewatchAlt.: 2010 CR53 || 
|- id="2004 XB141" bgcolor=#E9E9E9
| 0 ||  || MBA-M || 16.98 || 1.7 km || multiple || 2004–2022 || 25 Jan 2022 || 129 || align=left | Disc.: SpacewatchAdded on 22 July 2020Alt.: 2015 HO35 || 
|- id="2004 XS141" bgcolor=#E9E9E9
| 0 ||  || MBA-M || 16.72 || 2.5 km || multiple || 2004–2021 || 21 Nov 2021 || 212 || align=left | Disc.: Spacewatch || 
|- id="2004 XV141" bgcolor=#E9E9E9
| 0 ||  || MBA-M || 16.7 || 1.4 km || multiple || 2004–2021 || 17 Jan 2021 || 97 || align=left | Disc.: CSSAdded on 17 January 2021 || 
|- id="2004 XY141" bgcolor=#E9E9E9
| 0 ||  || MBA-M || 18.63 || data-sort-value="0.79" | 790 m || multiple || 2004–2021 || 31 Aug 2021 || 31 || align=left | Disc.: Spacewatch  || 
|- id="2004 XB142" bgcolor=#fefefe
| 0 ||  || MBA-I || 17.6 || data-sort-value="0.90" | 900 m || multiple || 2000–2020 || 21 Mar 2020 || 71 || align=left | Disc.: Spacewatch || 
|- id="2004 XR142" bgcolor=#E9E9E9
| 0 ||  || MBA-M || 17.1 || 1.1 km || multiple || 1995–2020 || 14 Oct 2020 || 112 || align=left | Disc.: SpacewatchAlt.: 2016 QE77 || 
|- id="2004 XK143" bgcolor=#E9E9E9
| 0 ||  || MBA-M || 18.25 || data-sort-value="0.67" | 670 m || multiple || 2004–2022 || 27 Jan 2022 || 59 || align=left | Disc.: SpacewatchAlt.: 2008 WG71 || 
|- id="2004 XY144" bgcolor=#E9E9E9
| 3 ||  || MBA-M || 17.6 || data-sort-value="0.90" | 900 m || multiple || 2004–2020 || 05 Dec 2020 || 54 || align=left | Disc.: SpacewatchAdded on 17 January 2021 || 
|- id="2004 XA146" bgcolor=#fefefe
| 0 ||  || MBA-I || 17.44 || data-sort-value="0.97" | 970 m || multiple || 2004–2021 || 11 May 2021 || 232 || align=left | Disc.: CSS || 
|- id="2004 XF146" bgcolor=#d6d6d6
| 0 ||  || MBA-O || 16.43 || 2.9 km || multiple || 2004–2022 || 25 Jan 2022 || 126 || align=left | Disc.: Spacewatch  || 
|- id="2004 XL148" bgcolor=#d6d6d6
| 0 ||  || MBA-O || 16.6 || 2.7 km || multiple || 2004–2021 || 18 Jan 2021 || 112 || align=left | Disc.: Spacewatch || 
|- id="2004 XH149" bgcolor=#d6d6d6
| 0 ||  || MBA-O || 16.30 || 3.1 km || multiple || 2000–2022 || 10 Jan 2022 || 73 || align=left | Disc.: Spacewatch || 
|- id="2004 XT149" bgcolor=#fefefe
| 0 ||  || HUN || 18.6 || data-sort-value="0.57" | 570 m || multiple || 2003–2020 || 17 Dec 2020 || 64 || align=left | Disc.: SpacewatchAlt.: 2013 AD1 || 
|- id="2004 XN150" bgcolor=#d6d6d6
| 0 ||  || MBA-O || 16.44 || 2.9 km || multiple || 2003–2022 || 12 Jan 2022 || 133 || align=left | Disc.: Spacewatch || 
|- id="2004 XQ150" bgcolor=#fefefe
| 0 ||  || MBA-I || 18.80 || data-sort-value="0.52" | 520 m || multiple || 2004–2021 || 10 Aug 2021 || 45 || align=left | Disc.: Spacewatch || 
|- id="2004 XO151" bgcolor=#E9E9E9
| 2 ||  || MBA-M || 19.2 || data-sort-value="0.43" | 430 m || multiple || 2004–2020 || 11 Dec 2020 || 57 || align=left | Disc.: Spacewatch || 
|- id="2004 XV151" bgcolor=#E9E9E9
| 0 ||  || MBA-M || 16.63 || 1.4 km || multiple || 2004–2022 || 13 Jan 2022 || 119 || align=left | Disc.: SpacewatchAlt.: 2008 XK28 || 
|- id="2004 XZ151" bgcolor=#E9E9E9
| 2 ||  || MBA-M || 17.6 || data-sort-value="0.90" | 900 m || multiple || 2004–2020 || 15 Sep 2020 || 60 || align=left | Disc.: SpacewatchAdded on 19 October 2020Alt.: 2008 WQ131 || 
|- id="2004 XG152" bgcolor=#d6d6d6
| 0 ||  || HIL || 16.2 || 3.2 km || multiple || 2004–2021 || 17 Jan 2021 || 71 || align=left | Disc.: Spacewatch || 
|- id="2004 XN152" bgcolor=#E9E9E9
| 1 ||  || MBA-M || 18.3 || data-sort-value="0.65" | 650 m || multiple || 2004–2020 || 16 Nov 2020 || 125 || align=left | Disc.: SpacewatchAlt.: 2016 TV45 || 
|- id="2004 XR152" bgcolor=#fefefe
| 3 ||  || MBA-I || 18.6 || data-sort-value="0.57" | 570 m || multiple || 2004–2017 || 27 Mar 2017 || 38 || align=left | Disc.: SpacewatchAdded on 22 July 2020 || 
|- id="2004 XC153" bgcolor=#E9E9E9
| 0 ||  || MBA-M || 17.62 || 1.3 km || multiple || 2004–2021 || 30 Nov 2021 || 92 || align=left | Disc.: SpacewatchAdded on 24 December 2021 || 
|- id="2004 XH153" bgcolor=#d6d6d6
| 0 ||  || MBA-O || 16.88 || 2.3 km || multiple || 1998–2022 || 26 Jan 2022 || 145 || align=left | Disc.: SpacewatchAlt.: 2017 HU8 || 
|- id="2004 XL153" bgcolor=#E9E9E9
| 0 ||  || MBA-M || 17.9 || 1.5 km || multiple || 2003–2019 || 26 Feb 2019 || 46 || align=left | Disc.: Spacewatch || 
|- id="2004 XM153" bgcolor=#fefefe
| 0 ||  || MBA-I || 18.15 || data-sort-value="0.70" | 700 m || multiple || 2004–2021 || 13 May 2021 || 125 || align=left | Disc.: Spacewatch || 
|- id="2004 XB154" bgcolor=#d6d6d6
| 0 ||  || MBA-O || 17.3 || 1.9 km || multiple || 2004–2020 || 12 Dec 2020 || 96 || align=left | Disc.: SpacewatchAdded on 17 January 2021 || 
|- id="2004 XC154" bgcolor=#fefefe
| 0 ||  || MBA-I || 18.8 || data-sort-value="0.52" | 520 m || multiple || 2004–2020 || 22 Apr 2020 || 55 || align=left | Disc.: SpacewatchAlt.: 2011 UD31, 2011 VH17 || 
|- id="2004 XH154" bgcolor=#E9E9E9
| 0 ||  || MBA-M || 18.06 || 1.0 km || multiple || 2004–2021 || 09 Nov 2021 || 78 || align=left | Disc.: SpacewatchAdded on 22 July 2020 || 
|- id="2004 XQ154" bgcolor=#E9E9E9
| 3 ||  || MBA-M || 18.3 || data-sort-value="0.65" | 650 m || multiple || 2004–2020 || 14 Dec 2020 || 33 || align=left | Disc.: SpacewatchAdded on 17 January 2021 || 
|- id="2004 XW154" bgcolor=#E9E9E9
| 0 ||  || MBA-M || 17.5 || data-sort-value="0.94" | 940 m || multiple || 2004–2020 || 20 Dec 2020 || 132 || align=left | Disc.: SpacewatchAlt.: 2016 WS28 || 
|- id="2004 XB155" bgcolor=#d6d6d6
| 0 ||  || MBA-O || 16.12 || 3.3 km || multiple || 2004–2022 || 04 Jan 2022 || 123 || align=left | Disc.: SpacewatchAlt.: 2010 BT47, 2015 TQ230 || 
|- id="2004 XV155" bgcolor=#d6d6d6
| 0 ||  || MBA-O || 17.4 || 1.8 km || multiple || 2004–2021 || 07 Jan 2021 || 34 || align=left | Disc.: SpacewatchAdded on 19 October 2020 || 
|- id="2004 XD156" bgcolor=#fefefe
| 0 ||  || MBA-I || 17.35 || 1.0 km || multiple || 2004–2021 || 18 May 2021 || 121 || align=left | Disc.: SpacewatchAlt.: 2010 GE131, 2015 XH259 || 
|- id="2004 XL156" bgcolor=#E9E9E9
| 0 ||  || MBA-M || 16.29 || 1.6 km || multiple || 2004–2022 || 27 Jan 2022 || 132 || align=left | Disc.: SpacewatchAlt.: 2010 KB112, 2015 LR28 || 
|- id="2004 XM156" bgcolor=#d6d6d6
| 1 ||  || MBA-O || 17.97 || 1.4 km || multiple || 2004–2021 || 04 Apr 2021 || 58 || align=left | Disc.: SpacewatchAdded on 22 July 2020Alt.: 2010 DL30 || 
|- id="2004 XX157" bgcolor=#E9E9E9
| 0 ||  || MBA-M || 18.02 || 1.0 km || multiple || 2004–2021 || 08 Dec 2021 || 44 || align=left | Disc.: Spacewatch || 
|- id="2004 XD158" bgcolor=#d6d6d6
| 0 ||  || MBA-O || 16.6 || 2.7 km || multiple || 2004–2021 || 04 Jan 2021 || 60 || align=left | Disc.: SpacewatchAdded on 22 July 2020Alt.: 2010 CQ130 || 
|- id="2004 XN158" bgcolor=#fefefe
| 0 ||  || MBA-I || 18.86 || data-sort-value="0.50" | 500 m || multiple || 2004–2021 || 04 Oct 2021 || 39 || align=left | Disc.: SpacewatchAlt.: 2009 HC53 || 
|- id="2004 XQ158" bgcolor=#E9E9E9
| 0 ||  || MBA-M || 17.59 || 1.3 km || multiple || 2004–2022 || 27 Jan 2022 || 54 || align=left | Disc.: Spacewatch || 
|- id="2004 XS158" bgcolor=#C2FFFF
| 0 ||  || JT || 13.72 || 10 km || multiple || 2004–2021 || 28 Aug 2021 || 200 || align=left | Disc.: SpacewatchTrojan camp (L5) || 
|- id="2004 XB159" bgcolor=#E9E9E9
| 1 ||  || MBA-M || 18.6 || data-sort-value="0.80" | 800 m || multiple || 2004–2022 || 08 Jan 2022 || 18 || align=left | Disc.: SpacewatchAdded on 29 January 2022 || 
|- id="2004 XQ159" bgcolor=#E9E9E9
| 1 ||  || MBA-M || 17.9 || data-sort-value="0.78" | 780 m || multiple || 2001–2020 || 17 Dec 2020 || 122 || align=left | Disc.: Spacewatch || 
|- id="2004 XM160" bgcolor=#E9E9E9
| 0 ||  || MBA-M || 17.35 || 1.4 km || multiple || 2004–2022 || 13 Jan 2022 || 80 || align=left | Disc.: Spacewatch || 
|- id="2004 XN160" bgcolor=#E9E9E9
| 3 ||  || MBA-M || 18.1 || data-sort-value="0.71" | 710 m || multiple || 2004–2021 || 04 Jan 2021 || 55 || align=left | Disc.: SpacewatchAlt.: 2008 XE42 || 
|- id="2004 XO160" bgcolor=#d6d6d6
| 1 ||  || MBA-O || 17.1 || 2.1 km || multiple || 2004–2021 || 05 Jan 2021 || 69 || align=left | Disc.: SpacewatchAlt.: 2010 CB215 || 
|- id="2004 XV160" bgcolor=#fefefe
| 0 ||  || MBA-I || 17.76 || data-sort-value="0.83" | 830 m || multiple || 2002–2021 || 01 May 2021 || 110 || align=left | Disc.: SpacewatchAlt.: 2015 VQ115 || 
|- id="2004 XG161" bgcolor=#fefefe
| 0 ||  || MBA-I || 17.23 || 1.1 km || multiple || 1996–2021 || 03 May 2021 || 217 || align=left | Disc.: SpacewatchAlt.: 2010 LC158, 2015 VJ73, 2017 BF108 || 
|- id="2004 XK163" bgcolor=#fefefe
| 0 ||  || MBA-I || 18.94 || data-sort-value="0.48" | 480 m || multiple || 2004–2021 || 06 Nov 2021 || 91 || align=left | Disc.: Spacewatch || 
|- id="2004 XL163" bgcolor=#fefefe
| 0 ||  || MBA-I || 18.4 || data-sort-value="0.62" | 620 m || multiple || 2004–2020 || 29 Apr 2020 || 67 || align=left | Disc.: SpacewatchAlt.: 2011 WP110, 2016 CJ35 || 
|- id="2004 XN163" bgcolor=#d6d6d6
| 0 ||  || MBA-O || 17.16 || 2.1 km || multiple || 2004–2021 || 01 Apr 2021 || 75 || align=left | Disc.: SpacewatchAdded on 9 March 2021Alt.: 2020 XE11 || 
|- id="2004 XK164" bgcolor=#fefefe
| 0 ||  || MBA-I || 17.9 || data-sort-value="0.78" | 780 m || multiple || 2004–2020 || 24 Mar 2020 || 105 || align=left | Disc.: Calvin-RehobothAlt.: 2011 UU332 || 
|- id="2004 XM164" bgcolor=#E9E9E9
| 0 ||  || MBA-M || 17.21 || 1.5 km || multiple || 1999–2021 || 27 Nov 2021 || 149 || align=left | Disc.: Calvin-Rehoboth || 
|- id="2004 XP165" bgcolor=#d6d6d6
| 0 ||  || MBA-O || 17.19 || 2.0 km || multiple || 2004–2022 || 25 Jan 2022 || 118 || align=left | Disc.: LINEARAdded on 9 March 2021Alt.: 2020 QG10 || 
|- id="2004 XE166" bgcolor=#E9E9E9
| 0 ||  || MBA-M || 16.93 || 1.2 km || multiple || 2004–2022 || 11 Jan 2022 || 112 || align=left | Disc.: NEATAlt.: 2008 XX7 || 
|- id="2004 XC167" bgcolor=#E9E9E9
| 0 ||  || MBA-M || 17.69 || 1.2 km || multiple || 2004–2021 || 23 Dec 2021 || 87 || align=left | Disc.: LONEOS || 
|- id="2004 XG167" bgcolor=#E9E9E9
| 0 ||  || MBA-M || 17.98 || 1.4 km || multiple || 2004–2019 || 06 Jan 2019 || 30 || align=left | Disc.: SpacewatchAdded on 22 July 2020Alt.: 2015 FQ381 || 
|- id="2004 XK168" bgcolor=#d6d6d6
| 0 ||  || MBA-O || 16.30 || 3.1 km || multiple || 2004–2022 || 07 Jan 2022 || 168 || align=left | Disc.: LONEOSAlt.: 2015 TE239 || 
|- id="2004 XJ169" bgcolor=#d6d6d6
| 0 ||  || MBA-O || 16.06 || 3.4 km || multiple || 2004–2022 || 04 Jan 2022 || 149 || align=left | Disc.: SpacewatchAlt.: 2010 AJ98, 2015 VD119 || 
|- id="2004 XY170" bgcolor=#E9E9E9
| 0 ||  || MBA-M || 16.74 || 1.9 km || multiple || 2001–2022 || 13 Jan 2022 || 257 || align=left | Disc.: SpacewatchAlt.: 2012 VM45, 2014 EO112 || 
|- id="2004 XU172" bgcolor=#fefefe
| 1 ||  || MBA-I || 17.8 || data-sort-value="0.82" | 820 m || multiple || 2004–2020 || 21 Jun 2020 || 47 || align=left | Disc.: SpacewatchAlt.: 2019 AS19 || 
|- id="2004 XB173" bgcolor=#fefefe
| 0 ||  || MBA-I || 18.44 || data-sort-value="0.61" | 610 m || multiple || 2004–2021 || 17 Apr 2021 || 35 || align=left | Disc.: SpacewatchAdded on 17 January 2021 || 
|- id="2004 XA174" bgcolor=#E9E9E9
| 0 ||  || MBA-M || 17.04 || 1.2 km || multiple || 2000–2021 || 04 Jan 2021 || 53 || align=left | Disc.: SpacewatchAdded on 17 June 2021Alt.: 2000 XR1, 2014 FB27 || 
|- id="2004 XB174" bgcolor=#fefefe
| 0 ||  || MBA-I || 18.09 || data-sort-value="0.72" | 720 m || multiple || 2004–2022 || 06 Jan 2022 || 74 || align=left | Disc.: Spacewatch || 
|- id="2004 XG175" bgcolor=#fefefe
| 1 ||  || MBA-I || 18.9 || data-sort-value="0.49" | 490 m || multiple || 2004–2018 || 03 Oct 2018 || 38 || align=left | Disc.: Spacewatch || 
|- id="2004 XH175" bgcolor=#d6d6d6
| 0 ||  || MBA-O || 16.50 || 2.8 km || multiple || 2004–2021 || 11 Apr 2021 || 154 || align=left | Disc.: SpacewatchAlt.: 2008 RB66 || 
|- id="2004 XN175" bgcolor=#d6d6d6
| 0 ||  || MBA-O || 18.0 || 1.4 km || multiple || 2003–2021 || 17 Jan 2021 || 35 || align=left | Disc.: SpacewatchAdded on 22 July 2020 || 
|- id="2004 XH176" bgcolor=#E9E9E9
| 0 ||  || MBA-M || 16.8 || 1.3 km || multiple || 2004–2021 || 17 Jan 2021 || 133 || align=left | Disc.: SpacewatchAlt.: 2006 KG36, 2007 RP101, 2011 QK16 || 
|- id="2004 XQ177" bgcolor=#E9E9E9
| 0 ||  || MBA-M || 16.9 || 2.3 km || multiple || 1999–2020 || 27 Apr 2020 || 92 || align=left | Disc.: CINEOSAlt.: 2008 RF16, 2015 FL47 || 
|- id="2004 XL180" bgcolor=#fefefe
| 0 ||  || MBA-I || 18.66 || data-sort-value="0.55" | 550 m || multiple || 2004–2022 || 01 Jan 2022 || 96 || align=left | Disc.: SpacewatchAlt.: 2014 WC181 || 
|- id="2004 XA181" bgcolor=#d6d6d6
| 0 ||  || MBA-O || 17.02 || 2.2 km || multiple || 2004–2022 || 25 Jan 2022 || 46 || align=left | Disc.: CINEOSAlt.: 2010 CY210 || 
|- id="2004 XO182" bgcolor=#E9E9E9
| 0 ||  || MBA-M || 16.73 || 1.3 km || multiple || 2004–2022 || 27 Jan 2022 || 113 || align=left | Disc.: NEATAlt.: 2010 JL71 || 
|- id="2004 XM184" bgcolor=#fefefe
| 0 ||  || MBA-I || 18.88 || data-sort-value="0.50" | 500 m || multiple || 2004–2021 || 27 Nov 2021 || 85 || align=left | Disc.: LINEARAdded on 22 July 2020 || 
|- id="2004 XZ184" bgcolor=#fefefe
| 0 ||  || MBA-I || 17.8 || data-sort-value="0.82" | 820 m || multiple || 2004–2020 || 24 Mar 2020 || 80 || align=left | Disc.: CSS || 
|- id="2004 XG185" bgcolor=#fefefe
| 0 ||  || MBA-I || 17.83 || data-sort-value="0.81" | 810 m || multiple || 2004–2021 || 23 Nov 2021 || 122 || align=left | Disc.: Spacewatch || 
|- id="2004 XJ185" bgcolor=#d6d6d6
| 0 ||  || MBA-O || 16.88 || 2.3 km || multiple || 2004–2022 || 27 Jan 2022 || 69 || align=left | Disc.: Spacewatch || 
|- id="2004 XQ185" bgcolor=#d6d6d6
| 0 ||  || MBA-O || 15.80 || 3.9 km || multiple || 1998–2022 || 21 Jan 2022 || 166 || align=left | Disc.: LINEARAlt.: 2012 HR55, 2015 TB258 || 
|- id="2004 XW185" bgcolor=#FA8072
| 0 ||  || MCA || 18.15 || data-sort-value="0.99" | 990 m || multiple || 2001–2022 || 27 Jan 2022 || 63 || align=left | Disc.: LPL/Spacewatch II || 
|- id="2004 XZ185" bgcolor=#FA8072
| 3 ||  || MCA || 19.3 || data-sort-value="0.77" | 770 m || multiple || 2004–2019 || 03 Jan 2019 || 38 || align=left | Disc.: CSSAlt.: 2018 VM67 || 
|- id="2004 XM186" bgcolor=#FA8072
| 2 ||  || MCA || 19.6 || data-sort-value="0.51" | 510 m || multiple || 2004–2021 || 04 Oct 2021 || 37 || align=left | Disc.: SpacewatchAdded on 30 September 2021 || 
|- id="2004 XW186" bgcolor=#C2E0FF
| E ||  || TNO || 8.7 || 62 km || single || 2 days || 14 Dec 2004 || 3 || align=left | Disc.: Mauna Kea Obs.LoUTNOs, cubewano? || 
|- id="2004 XX186" bgcolor=#C2E0FF
| E ||  || TNO || 8.6 || 65 km || single || 2 days || 14 Dec 2004 || 3 || align=left | Disc.: Mauna Kea Obs.LoUTNOs, cubewano? || 
|- id="2004 XY186" bgcolor=#C2E0FF
| E ||  || TNO || 9.8 || 52 km || single || 2 days || 14 Dec 2004 || 3 || align=left | Disc.: Mauna Kea Obs.LoUTNOs, plutino? || 
|- id="2004 XZ186" bgcolor=#C2E0FF
| E ||  || TNO || 10.0 || 47 km || single || 2 days || 14 Dec 2004 || 3 || align=left | Disc.: Mauna Kea Obs.LoUTNOs, plutino? || 
|- id="2004 XA187" bgcolor=#d6d6d6
| 0 ||  || MBA-O || 15.9 || 3.7 km || multiple || 2004–2020 || 08 Dec 2020 || 135 || align=left | Disc.: Mauna Kea Obs.Alt.: 2014 SK246, 2015 XJ239 || 
|- id="2004 XP187" bgcolor=#E9E9E9
| 0 ||  || MBA-M || 18.3 || data-sort-value="0.92" | 920 m || multiple || 2004–2020 || 16 Jun 2020 || 43 || align=left | Disc.: Mauna Kea Obs. || 
|- id="2004 XS187" bgcolor=#fefefe
| 0 ||  || MBA-I || 19.00 || data-sort-value="0.47" | 470 m || multiple || 2000–2021 || 07 Oct 2021 || 81 || align=left | Disc.: Mauna Kea Obs.Alt.: 2014 SO172 || 
|- id="2004 XV187" bgcolor=#d6d6d6
| 0 ||  || MBA-O || 17.17 || 2.0 km || multiple || 2004–2021 || 09 Dec 2021 || 115 || align=left | Disc.: Mauna Kea Obs. || 
|- id="2004 XA188" bgcolor=#E9E9E9
| 1 ||  || MBA-M || 18.4 || data-sort-value="0.62" | 620 m || multiple || 2004–2020 || 15 Oct 2020 || 32 || align=left | —Added on 22 July 2020Alt.: 2012 UD99 || 
|- id="2004 XC188" bgcolor=#d6d6d6
| 0 ||  || MBA-O || 17.48 || 1.8 km || multiple || 2004–2021 || 15 May 2021 || 76 || align=left | Disc.: Mauna Kea Obs.Alt.: 2006 ES34 || 
|- id="2004 XE188" bgcolor=#E9E9E9
| 0 ||  || MBA-M || 17.32 || 1.4 km || multiple || 2004–2021 || 02 Dec 2021 || 296 || align=left | Disc.: Mauna Kea Obs.Alt.: 2008 SJ295 || 
|- id="2004 XG188" bgcolor=#d6d6d6
| 0 ||  || MBA-O || 17.8 || 1.5 km || multiple || 2004–2020 || 16 Nov 2020 || 49 || align=left | Disc.: Mauna Kea Obs.Added on 17 January 2021 || 
|- id="2004 XJ188" bgcolor=#d6d6d6
| 0 ||  || MBA-O || 16.82 || 2.4 km || multiple || 2004–2022 || 05 Jan 2022 || 95 || align=left | Disc.: Mauna Kea Obs. || 
|- id="2004 XM188" bgcolor=#d6d6d6
| 0 ||  || MBA-O || 17.3 || 1.9 km || multiple || 1998–2020 || 09 Dec 2020 || 89 || align=left | Disc.: SDSSAlt.: 1998 SP173, 2009 VX117, 2009 WJ35 || 
|- id="2004 XQ188" bgcolor=#E9E9E9
| 1 ||  || MBA-M || 18.68 || data-sort-value="0.77" | 770 m || multiple || 2004–2021 || 31 Jul 2021 || 27 || align=left | Disc.: Mauna Kea Obs. || 
|- id="2004 XZ188" bgcolor=#d6d6d6
| 4 ||  || MBA-O || 17.34 || 1.9 km || multiple || 2004–2021 || 08 Aug 2021 || 13 || align=left | Disc.: Mauna Kea Obs.Added on 21 August 2021 || 
|- id="2004 XD189" bgcolor=#d6d6d6
| 0 ||  || MBA-O || 17.0 || 2.2 km || multiple || 2003–2021 || 16 Jan 2021 || 68 || align=left | Disc.: Mauna Kea Obs.Added on 22 July 2020Alt.: 2006 DL183 || 
|- id="2004 XE189" bgcolor=#fefefe
| 1 ||  || MBA-I || 19.1 || data-sort-value="0.45" | 450 m || multiple || 2004–2020 || 25 May 2020 || 36 || align=left | Disc.: Mauna Kea Obs.Added on 19 October 2020 || 
|- id="2004 XF189" bgcolor=#fefefe
| 0 ||  || MBA-I || 18.7 || data-sort-value="0.54" | 540 m || multiple || 2004–2020 || 26 May 2020 || 48 || align=left | Disc.: Mauna Kea Obs.Added on 22 July 2020Alt.: 2020 FW13 || 
|- id="2004 XJ189" bgcolor=#d6d6d6
| 0 ||  || MBA-O || 16.8 || 2.4 km || multiple || 2004–2020 || 11 Dec 2020 || 46 || align=left | Disc.: Mauna Kea Obs.Alt.: 2015 XH343 || 
|- id="2004 XA190" bgcolor=#d6d6d6
| 0 ||  || MBA-O || 17.2 || 2.0 km || multiple || 2004–2020 || 07 Dec 2020 || 34 || align=left | Disc.: Mauna Kea Obs.Added on 11 May 2021Alt.: 2019 SE170 || 
|- id="2004 XJ190" bgcolor=#E9E9E9
| 0 ||  || MBA-M || 18.0 || data-sort-value="0.75" | 750 m || multiple || 2004–2019 || 06 Sep 2019 || 56 || align=left | Disc.: Mauna Kea Obs.Alt.: 2015 OJ40 || 
|- id="2004 XM190" bgcolor=#fefefe
| 2 ||  || MBA-I || 19.2 || data-sort-value="0.43" | 430 m || multiple || 2004–2019 || 01 Jul 2019 || 24 || align=left | Disc.: Mauna Kea Obs. || 
|- id="2004 XO190" bgcolor=#d6d6d6
| 0 ||  || MBA-O || 16.5 || 2.8 km || multiple || 2004–2021 || 12 Jan 2021 || 121 || align=left | Disc.: Mauna Kea Obs.Alt.: 2009 VV19 || 
|- id="2004 XQ190" bgcolor=#C7FF8F
| E ||  || CEN || 12.0 || 22 km || single || 2 days || 14 Dec 2004 || 4 || align=left | Disc.: Mauna Kea Obs. || 
|- id="2004 XR190" bgcolor=#C2E0FF
| 1 ||  || TNO || 4.3 || 574 km || multiple || 2002–2017 || 01 Sep 2017 || 114 || align=left | Disc.: Mauna Kea Obs.LoUTNOs, other TNO, BR-mag: 1.24; taxonomy: BR || 
|- id="2004 XX190" bgcolor=#C2E0FF
| 3 ||  || TNO || 6.90 || 139 km || multiple || 2003–2020 || 09 Dec 2020 || 29 || align=left | Disc.: Mauna Kea Obs.LoUTNOs, cubewano (cold) || 
|- id="2004 XZ191" bgcolor=#E9E9E9
| 0 ||  || MBA-M || 17.43 || 1.8 km || multiple || 2004–2021 || 06 Apr 2021 || 94 || align=left | Disc.: Mauna Kea Obs.Alt.: 2014 WC163 || 
|- id="2004 XD193" bgcolor=#E9E9E9
| 0 ||  || MBA-M || 17.5 || data-sort-value="0.94" | 940 m || multiple || 2004–2020 || 08 Dec 2020 || 185 || align=left | Disc.: CINEOS || 
|- id="2004 XE193" bgcolor=#fefefe
| 0 ||  || MBA-I || 18.24 || data-sort-value="0.67" | 670 m || multiple || 2004–2022 || 25 Jan 2022 || 130 || align=left | Disc.: Spacewatch || 
|- id="2004 XK193" bgcolor=#E9E9E9
| 0 ||  || MBA-M || 17.38 || data-sort-value="0.99" | 990 m || multiple || 2004–2022 || 25 Jan 2022 || 257 || align=left | Disc.: Spacewatch || 
|- id="2004 XM193" bgcolor=#fefefe
| 0 ||  || MBA-I || 18.3 || data-sort-value="0.65" | 650 m || multiple || 2004–2020 || 16 Mar 2020 || 84 || align=left | Disc.: Spacewatch || 
|- id="2004 XQ193" bgcolor=#E9E9E9
| 0 ||  || MBA-M || 17.23 || 1.5 km || multiple || 2004–2021 || 30 Nov 2021 || 115 || align=left | Disc.: Spacewatch || 
|- id="2004 XU193" bgcolor=#fefefe
| 0 ||  || MBA-I || 17.5 || data-sort-value="0.94" | 940 m || multiple || 2004–2020 || 12 Apr 2020 || 117 || align=left | Disc.: Spacewatch || 
|- id="2004 XX193" bgcolor=#E9E9E9
| 0 ||  || MBA-M || 17.94 || data-sort-value="0.77" | 770 m || multiple || 2004–2022 || 25 Jan 2022 || 83 || align=left | Disc.: Spacewatch || 
|- id="2004 XY193" bgcolor=#fefefe
| 0 ||  || MBA-I || 17.8 || data-sort-value="0.82" | 820 m || multiple || 2004–2020 || 22 Apr 2020 || 125 || align=left | Disc.: Spacewatch || 
|- id="2004 XC194" bgcolor=#d6d6d6
| 0 ||  || MBA-O || 16.3 || 3.1 km || multiple || 2004–2021 || 04 Jan 2021 || 103 || align=left | Disc.: LPL/Spacewatch II || 
|- id="2004 XD194" bgcolor=#fefefe
| 0 ||  || MBA-I || 17.8 || data-sort-value="0.82" | 820 m || multiple || 2004–2018 || 18 Jun 2018 || 53 || align=left | Disc.: Spacewatch || 
|- id="2004 XE194" bgcolor=#d6d6d6
| 0 ||  || MBA-O || 16.16 || 3.3 km || multiple || 1995–2022 || 17 Jan 2022 || 133 || align=left | Disc.: Spacewatch || 
|- id="2004 XF194" bgcolor=#fefefe
| 0 ||  || MBA-I || 17.7 || data-sort-value="0.86" | 860 m || multiple || 2004–2021 || 11 Jun 2021 || 82 || align=left | Disc.: LPL/Spacewatch II || 
|- id="2004 XH194" bgcolor=#fefefe
| 0 ||  || MBA-I || 18.89 || data-sort-value="0.50" | 500 m || multiple || 2004–2021 || 07 Oct 2021 || 74 || align=left | Disc.: Spacewatch || 
|- id="2004 XJ194" bgcolor=#d6d6d6
| 0 ||  || MBA-O || 16.51 || 2.8 km || multiple || 2004–2021 || 05 Jul 2021 || 156 || align=left | Disc.: Spacewatch || 
|- id="2004 XK194" bgcolor=#E9E9E9
| 0 ||  || MBA-M || 17.43 || 1.8 km || multiple || 2004–2021 || 21 Nov 2021 || 104 || align=left | Disc.: LPL/Spacewatch II || 
|- id="2004 XL194" bgcolor=#E9E9E9
| 0 ||  || MBA-M || 17.9 || data-sort-value="0.78" | 780 m || multiple || 2004–2020 || 11 Dec 2020 || 132 || align=left | Disc.: Spacewatch || 
|- id="2004 XM194" bgcolor=#E9E9E9
| 0 ||  || MBA-M || 17.61 || 1.7 km || multiple || 2004–2021 || 11 Sep 2021 || 79 || align=left | Disc.: Spacewatch || 
|- id="2004 XO194" bgcolor=#fefefe
| 0 ||  || MBA-I || 18.68 || data-sort-value="0.55" | 550 m || multiple || 2004–2022 || 26 Jan 2022 || 74 || align=left | Disc.: Spacewatch || 
|- id="2004 XP194" bgcolor=#fefefe
| 0 ||  || MBA-I || 18.17 || data-sort-value="0.69" | 690 m || multiple || 2004–2021 || 30 Oct 2021 || 85 || align=left | Disc.: Spacewatch || 
|- id="2004 XQ194" bgcolor=#E9E9E9
| 0 ||  || MBA-M || 17.4 || data-sort-value="0.98" | 980 m || multiple || 2004–2021 || 16 Jan 2021 || 92 || align=left | Disc.: Spacewatch || 
|- id="2004 XR194" bgcolor=#fefefe
| 0 ||  || MBA-I || 18.1 || data-sort-value="0.71" | 710 m || multiple || 2004–2020 || 22 Mar 2020 || 93 || align=left | Disc.: CSS || 
|- id="2004 XV194" bgcolor=#E9E9E9
| 0 ||  || MBA-M || 17.21 || 2.0 km || multiple || 2004–2021 || 14 Sep 2021 || 96 || align=left | Disc.: Spacewatch || 
|- id="2004 XW194" bgcolor=#fefefe
| 0 ||  || MBA-I || 18.3 || data-sort-value="0.65" | 650 m || multiple || 2004–2021 || 15 Jan 2021 || 122 || align=left | Disc.: Spacewatch || 
|- id="2004 XY194" bgcolor=#E9E9E9
| 0 ||  || MBA-M || 17.62 || 1.3 km || multiple || 2004–2021 || 28 Oct 2021 || 84 || align=left | Disc.: Spacewatch || 
|- id="2004 XZ194" bgcolor=#E9E9E9
| 0 ||  || MBA-M || 16.8 || 2.4 km || multiple || 2004–2020 || 22 Mar 2020 || 59 || align=left | Disc.: Spacewatch || 
|- id="2004 XA195" bgcolor=#d6d6d6
| 0 ||  || MBA-O || 16.4 || 2.9 km || multiple || 2004–2021 || 12 Jan 2021 || 99 || align=left | Disc.: Spacewatch || 
|- id="2004 XB195" bgcolor=#E9E9E9
| 0 ||  || MBA-M || 17.74 || 1.2 km || multiple || 2004–2021 || 02 Dec 2021 || 89 || align=left | Disc.: Spacewatch || 
|- id="2004 XC195" bgcolor=#fefefe
| 0 ||  || MBA-I || 18.59 || data-sort-value="0.57" | 570 m || multiple || 2004–2021 || 14 Jun 2021 || 55 || align=left | Disc.: Spacewatch || 
|- id="2004 XD195" bgcolor=#E9E9E9
| 0 ||  || MBA-M || 17.1 || 1.1 km || multiple || 2004–2021 || 11 Jan 2021 || 82 || align=left | Disc.: LPL/Spacewatch II || 
|- id="2004 XE195" bgcolor=#E9E9E9
| 0 ||  || MBA-M || 17.2 || 2.0 km || multiple || 2004–2020 || 22 Apr 2020 || 62 || align=left | Disc.: Spacewatch || 
|- id="2004 XF195" bgcolor=#E9E9E9
| 1 ||  || MBA-M || 18.0 || data-sort-value="0.75" | 750 m || multiple || 2004–2020 || 16 Nov 2020 || 94 || align=left | Disc.: Spacewatch || 
|- id="2004 XG195" bgcolor=#E9E9E9
| 0 ||  || MBA-M || 17.58 || 1.3 km || multiple || 2004–2022 || 25 Jan 2022 || 67 || align=left | Disc.: LPL/Spacewatch II || 
|- id="2004 XH195" bgcolor=#fefefe
| 0 ||  || MBA-I || 18.5 || data-sort-value="0.59" | 590 m || multiple || 2004–2019 || 24 Dec 2019 || 54 || align=left | Disc.: Spacewatch || 
|- id="2004 XJ195" bgcolor=#fefefe
| 0 ||  || MBA-I || 18.42 || data-sort-value="0.62" | 620 m || multiple || 2004–2021 || 11 Sep 2021 || 75 || align=left | Disc.: Spacewatch || 
|- id="2004 XK195" bgcolor=#fefefe
| 0 ||  || MBA-I || 18.44 || data-sort-value="0.61" | 610 m || multiple || 2004–2021 || 07 Nov 2021 || 66 || align=left | Disc.: CINEOS || 
|- id="2004 XM195" bgcolor=#d6d6d6
| 0 ||  || MBA-O || 17.0 || 2.2 km || multiple || 2004–2021 || 04 Jan 2021 || 51 || align=left | Disc.: LPL/Spacewatch II || 
|- id="2004 XN195" bgcolor=#fefefe
| 1 ||  || MBA-I || 18.8 || data-sort-value="0.52" | 520 m || multiple || 2004–2018 || 06 Oct 2018 || 48 || align=left | Disc.: LPL/Spacewatch II || 
|- id="2004 XP195" bgcolor=#E9E9E9
| 0 ||  || MBA-M || 17.8 || data-sort-value="0.82" | 820 m || multiple || 2004–2021 || 15 Jan 2021 || 82 || align=left | Disc.: Spacewatch || 
|- id="2004 XQ195" bgcolor=#d6d6d6
| 0 ||  || MBA-O || 16.8 || 2.4 km || multiple || 2004–2017 || 24 May 2017 || 38 || align=left | Disc.: LPL/Spacewatch II || 
|- id="2004 XR195" bgcolor=#d6d6d6
| 0 ||  || MBA-O || 16.8 || 2.4 km || multiple || 2004–2020 || 10 Dec 2020 || 57 || align=left | Disc.: Spacewatch || 
|- id="2004 XT195" bgcolor=#d6d6d6
| 0 ||  || MBA-O || 17.26 || 2.0 km || multiple || 2004–2021 || 17 Feb 2021 || 56 || align=left | Disc.: Spacewatch || 
|- id="2004 XU195" bgcolor=#E9E9E9
| 0 ||  || MBA-M || 17.5 || 1.3 km || multiple || 2004–2020 || 12 Sep 2020 || 44 || align=left | Disc.: Spacewatch || 
|- id="2004 XW195" bgcolor=#E9E9E9
| 0 ||  || MBA-M || 17.22 || 1.5 km || multiple || 2004–2022 || 05 Jan 2022 || 95 || align=left | Disc.: Spacewatch || 
|- id="2004 XX195" bgcolor=#d6d6d6
| 0 ||  || MBA-O || 17.1 || 2.1 km || multiple || 2004–2020 || 22 Dec 2020 || 64 || align=left | Disc.: Spacewatch || 
|- id="2004 XY195" bgcolor=#E9E9E9
| 0 ||  || MBA-M || 18.09 || 1.0 km || multiple || 2004–2022 || 07 Jan 2022 || 51 || align=left | Disc.: Spacewatch || 
|- id="2004 XZ195" bgcolor=#d6d6d6
| 0 ||  || MBA-O || 16.68 || 2.6 km || multiple || 2004–2022 || 08 Jan 2022 || 73 || align=left | Disc.: SpacewatchAlt.: 2010 DN19 || 
|- id="2004 XB196" bgcolor=#d6d6d6
| 0 ||  || MBA-O || 16.32 || 3.0 km || multiple || 2004–2022 || 10 Jan 2022 || 69 || align=left | Disc.: SpacewatchAlt.: 2010 AH114 || 
|- id="2004 XC196" bgcolor=#fefefe
| 0 ||  || MBA-I || 18.0 || data-sort-value="0.75" | 750 m || multiple || 2004–2020 || 19 Jan 2020 || 77 || align=left | Disc.: Spacewatch || 
|- id="2004 XD196" bgcolor=#E9E9E9
| 2 ||  || MBA-M || 18.0 || data-sort-value="0.75" | 750 m || multiple || 2004–2020 || 14 Dec 2020 || 49 || align=left | Disc.: Spacewatch || 
|- id="2004 XE196" bgcolor=#FA8072
| 0 ||  || MCA || 18.3 || data-sort-value="0.65" | 650 m || multiple || 2004–2017 || 20 Nov 2017 || 33 || align=left | Disc.: Spacewatch || 
|- id="2004 XF196" bgcolor=#fefefe
| 1 ||  || MBA-I || 18.8 || data-sort-value="0.52" | 520 m || multiple || 2000–2020 || 22 Apr 2020 || 49 || align=left | Disc.: Spacewatch || 
|- id="2004 XG196" bgcolor=#fefefe
| 0 ||  || MBA-I || 18.73 || data-sort-value="0.53" | 530 m || multiple || 2004–2021 || 09 Nov 2021 || 40 || align=left | Disc.: Spacewatch || 
|- id="2004 XH196" bgcolor=#E9E9E9
| 0 ||  || MBA-M || 17.8 || data-sort-value="0.82" | 820 m || multiple || 2004–2020 || 15 Sep 2020 || 62 || align=left | Disc.: LPL/Spacewatch II || 
|- id="2004 XK196" bgcolor=#E9E9E9
| 0 ||  || MBA-M || 16.8 || 1.3 km || multiple || 2004–2021 || 13 Jan 2021 || 152 || align=left | Disc.: Spacewatch || 
|- id="2004 XL196" bgcolor=#E9E9E9
| 0 ||  || MBA-M || 17.0 || 1.2 km || multiple || 1993–2021 || 04 Jan 2021 || 97 || align=left | Disc.: Spacewatch || 
|- id="2004 XM196" bgcolor=#E9E9E9
| 0 ||  || MBA-M || 17.3 || 1.9 km || multiple || 2004–2019 || 25 Jan 2019 || 61 || align=left | Disc.: CINEOS || 
|- id="2004 XN196" bgcolor=#fefefe
| 0 ||  || MBA-I || 18.45 || data-sort-value="0.61" | 610 m || multiple || 2004–2021 || 30 Nov 2021 || 93 || align=left | Disc.: Spacewatch || 
|- id="2004 XO196" bgcolor=#fefefe
| 0 ||  || HUN || 17.8 || data-sort-value="0.82" | 820 m || multiple || 2004–2019 || 31 Oct 2019 || 86 || align=left | Disc.: Spacewatch || 
|- id="2004 XP196" bgcolor=#d6d6d6
| 0 ||  || MBA-O || 16.28 || 3.1 km || multiple || 2004–2022 || 07 Jan 2022 || 148 || align=left | Disc.: SpacewatchAlt.: 2009 VA92 || 
|- id="2004 XQ196" bgcolor=#E9E9E9
| 0 ||  || MBA-M || 17.21 || 1.5 km || multiple || 2004–2022 || 27 Jan 2022 || 74 || align=left | Disc.: Spacewatch || 
|- id="2004 XU196" bgcolor=#E9E9E9
| 1 ||  || MBA-M || 17.3 || 1.0 km || multiple || 2004–2021 || 18 Jan 2021 || 70 || align=left | Disc.: Spacewatch || 
|- id="2004 XV196" bgcolor=#fefefe
| 0 ||  || MBA-I || 18.11 || data-sort-value="0.71" | 710 m || multiple || 2004–2021 || 03 Oct 2021 || 112 || align=left | Disc.: Spacewatch || 
|- id="2004 XW196" bgcolor=#E9E9E9
| 0 ||  || MBA-M || 17.85 || 1.1 km || multiple || 2004–2021 || 30 Nov 2021 || 61 || align=left | Disc.: LPL/Spacewatch II || 
|- id="2004 XX196" bgcolor=#fefefe
| 0 ||  || MBA-I || 18.81 || data-sort-value="0.51" | 510 m || multiple || 2004–2021 || 03 Aug 2021 || 58 || align=left | Disc.: Mauna Kea Obs. || 
|- id="2004 XY196" bgcolor=#fefefe
| 0 ||  || MBA-I || 18.1 || data-sort-value="0.71" | 710 m || multiple || 2004–2019 || 26 Nov 2019 || 46 || align=left | Disc.: CINEOS || 
|- id="2004 XA197" bgcolor=#fefefe
| 0 ||  || MBA-I || 18.56 || data-sort-value="0.58" | 580 m || multiple || 2004–2021 || 07 Oct 2021 || 87 || align=left | Disc.: Spacewatch || 
|- id="2004 XB197" bgcolor=#d6d6d6
| 0 ||  || MBA-O || 16.7 || 2.5 km || multiple || 2004–2020 || 22 Dec 2020 || 57 || align=left | Disc.: Spacewatch || 
|- id="2004 XC197" bgcolor=#E9E9E9
| 0 ||  || MBA-M || 17.38 || 1.9 km || multiple || 2004–2021 || 13 Jul 2021 || 62 || align=left | Disc.: Spacewatch || 
|- id="2004 XD197" bgcolor=#d6d6d6
| 0 ||  || MBA-O || 17.0 || 2.2 km || multiple || 2004–2021 || 18 Jan 2021 || 59 || align=left | Disc.: Spacewatch || 
|- id="2004 XE197" bgcolor=#d6d6d6
| 0 ||  || MBA-O || 17.20 || 2.0 km || multiple || 1998–2021 || 10 May 2021 || 102 || align=left | Disc.: Spacewatch || 
|- id="2004 XF197" bgcolor=#E9E9E9
| 0 ||  || MBA-M || 17.59 || 1.7 km || multiple || 2004–2021 || 11 Oct 2021 || 40 || align=left | Disc.: Spacewatch || 
|- id="2004 XG197" bgcolor=#fefefe
| 0 ||  || MBA-I || 18.73 || data-sort-value="0.53" | 530 m || multiple || 2004–2021 || 10 Aug 2021 || 58 || align=left | Disc.: Spacewatch || 
|- id="2004 XJ197" bgcolor=#E9E9E9
| 0 ||  || MBA-M || 17.95 || 1.1 km || multiple || 2004–2021 || 10 Oct 2021 || 79 || align=left | Disc.: Spacewatch || 
|- id="2004 XK197" bgcolor=#fefefe
| 0 ||  || MBA-I || 18.51 || data-sort-value="0.59" | 590 m || multiple || 2004–2021 || 03 Dec 2021 || 97 || align=left | Disc.: Spacewatch || 
|- id="2004 XL197" bgcolor=#E9E9E9
| 0 ||  || MBA-M || 17.8 || 1.5 km || multiple || 2004–2019 || 04 Feb 2019 || 45 || align=left | Disc.: Spacewatch || 
|- id="2004 XM197" bgcolor=#E9E9E9
| 0 ||  || MBA-M || 17.99 || 1.1 km || multiple || 2004–2021 || 23 Nov 2021 || 49 || align=left | Disc.: Spacewatch || 
|- id="2004 XN197" bgcolor=#fefefe
| 0 ||  || MBA-I || 17.72 || data-sort-value="0.85" | 850 m || multiple || 2004–2022 || 04 Jan 2022 || 43 || align=left | Disc.: Spacewatch || 
|- id="2004 XO197" bgcolor=#d6d6d6
| 0 ||  || MBA-O || 16.3 || 3.1 km || multiple || 2004–2020 || 23 Nov 2020 || 38 || align=left | Disc.: Spacewatch || 
|- id="2004 XP197" bgcolor=#E9E9E9
| 0 ||  || MBA-M || 17.4 || 1.8 km || multiple || 2004–2020 || 22 Apr 2020 || 38 || align=left | Disc.: CINEOS || 
|- id="2004 XQ197" bgcolor=#E9E9E9
| 2 ||  || MBA-M || 18.7 || data-sort-value="0.54" | 540 m || multiple || 2004–2020 || 14 Oct 2020 || 57 || align=left | Disc.: LPL/Spacewatch II || 
|- id="2004 XR197" bgcolor=#E9E9E9
| 0 ||  || MBA-M || 17.62 || 1.3 km || multiple || 2004–2022 || 15 Jan 2022 || 89 || align=left | Disc.: Spacewatch || 
|- id="2004 XS197" bgcolor=#fefefe
| 0 ||  || MBA-I || 18.7 || data-sort-value="0.54" | 540 m || multiple || 2004–2019 || 02 Sep 2019 || 86 || align=left | Disc.: Spacewatch || 
|- id="2004 XV197" bgcolor=#d6d6d6
| 0 ||  || MBA-O || 16.6 || 2.7 km || multiple || 2004–2020 || 16 Dec 2020 || 151 || align=left | Disc.: SpacewatchAlt.: 2010 BS133 || 
|- id="2004 XW197" bgcolor=#fefefe
| 0 ||  || MBA-I || 17.4 || data-sort-value="0.98" | 980 m || multiple || 2004–2020 || 24 Mar 2020 || 84 || align=left | Disc.: Spacewatch || 
|- id="2004 XX197" bgcolor=#fefefe
| 0 ||  || MBA-I || 18.60 || data-sort-value="0.57" | 570 m || multiple || 2004–2021 || 03 Dec 2021 || 134 || align=left | Disc.: Spacewatch || 
|- id="2004 XY197" bgcolor=#fefefe
| 0 ||  || MBA-I || 18.0 || data-sort-value="0.75" | 750 m || multiple || 2004–2020 || 21 Apr 2020 || 70 || align=left | Disc.: Spacewatch || 
|- id="2004 XZ197" bgcolor=#fefefe
| 0 ||  || MBA-I || 18.31 || data-sort-value="0.65" | 650 m || multiple || 2004–2021 || 27 Nov 2021 || 129 || align=left | Disc.: Spacewatch || 
|- id="2004 XA198" bgcolor=#E9E9E9
| 0 ||  || MBA-M || 17.7 || data-sort-value="0.86" | 860 m || multiple || 2004–2021 || 07 Jan 2021 || 55 || align=left | Disc.: Spacewatch || 
|- id="2004 XB198" bgcolor=#d6d6d6
| 0 ||  || MBA-O || 16.9 || 2.3 km || multiple || 2004–2021 || 04 Jan 2021 || 50 || align=left | Disc.: Spacewatch || 
|- id="2004 XC198" bgcolor=#fefefe
| 0 ||  || MBA-I || 17.9 || data-sort-value="0.78" | 780 m || multiple || 1994–2018 || 13 Aug 2018 || 59 || align=left | Disc.: Spacewatch || 
|- id="2004 XE198" bgcolor=#E9E9E9
| 0 ||  || MBA-M || 18.0 || data-sort-value="0.75" | 750 m || multiple || 2004–2020 || 08 Dec 2020 || 93 || align=left | Disc.: Spacewatch || 
|- id="2004 XF198" bgcolor=#d6d6d6
| 0 ||  || MBA-O || 16.9 || 2.3 km || multiple || 2004–2021 || 18 Mar 2021 || 79 || align=left | Disc.: SpacewatchAlt.: 2010 EH9, 2011 FG42 || 
|- id="2004 XG198" bgcolor=#E9E9E9
| 0 ||  || MBA-M || 17.69 || 1.6 km || multiple || 2004–2021 || 03 Aug 2021 || 43 || align=left | Disc.: Spacewatch || 
|- id="2004 XH198" bgcolor=#d6d6d6
| 0 ||  || MBA-O || 16.8 || 2.4 km || multiple || 2004–2020 || 16 Dec 2020 || 72 || align=left | Disc.: Spacewatch || 
|- id="2004 XJ198" bgcolor=#fefefe
| 0 ||  || MBA-I || 19.0 || data-sort-value="0.47" | 470 m || multiple || 2004–2020 || 27 Jan 2020 || 29 || align=left | Disc.: Spacewatch || 
|- id="2004 XK198" bgcolor=#fefefe
| 0 ||  || MBA-I || 18.30 || data-sort-value="0.65" | 650 m || multiple || 2004–2021 || 11 Jun 2021 || 52 || align=left | Disc.: Mauna Kea Obs. || 
|- id="2004 XM198" bgcolor=#d6d6d6
| 0 ||  || MBA-O || 18.19 || 1.3 km || multiple || 2004–2021 || 06 Apr 2021 || 76 || align=left | Disc.: Spacewatch || 
|- id="2004 XN198" bgcolor=#d6d6d6
| 1 ||  || MBA-O || 16.4 || 2.9 km || multiple || 2004–2021 || 09 Jan 2021 || 44 || align=left | Disc.: SpacewatchAlt.: 2010 CH211 || 
|- id="2004 XO198" bgcolor=#fefefe
| 0 ||  || MBA-I || 18.5 || data-sort-value="0.59" | 590 m || multiple || 2004–2019 || 24 Aug 2019 || 29 || align=left | Disc.: LPL/Spacewatch II || 
|- id="2004 XP198" bgcolor=#d6d6d6
| 0 ||  || MBA-O || 16.63 || 2.6 km || multiple || 2004–2021 || 10 May 2021 || 99 || align=left | Disc.: Spacewatch || 
|- id="2004 XQ198" bgcolor=#fefefe
| 0 ||  || MBA-I || 18.2 || data-sort-value="0.68" | 680 m || multiple || 2004–2020 || 31 Jan 2020 || 66 || align=left | Disc.: Spacewatch || 
|- id="2004 XR198" bgcolor=#E9E9E9
| 0 ||  || MBA-M || 17.2 || 1.1 km || multiple || 2004–2021 || 08 Jan 2021 || 80 || align=left | Disc.: Spacewatch || 
|- id="2004 XT198" bgcolor=#fefefe
| 0 ||  || MBA-I || 18.7 || data-sort-value="0.54" | 540 m || multiple || 2004–2020 || 02 Feb 2020 || 47 || align=left | Disc.: Spacewatch || 
|- id="2004 XU198" bgcolor=#fefefe
| 0 ||  || MBA-I || 18.39 || data-sort-value="0.62" | 620 m || multiple || 2004–2021 || 04 Oct 2021 || 63 || align=left | Disc.: Spacewatch || 
|- id="2004 XV198" bgcolor=#d6d6d6
| 0 ||  || MBA-O || 17.11 || 2.1 km || multiple || 2004–2022 || 25 Jan 2022 || 52 || align=left | Disc.: Spacewatch || 
|- id="2004 XW198" bgcolor=#E9E9E9
| 2 ||  || MBA-M || 17.0 || 1.2 km || multiple || 2004–2021 || 11 Jan 2021 || 56 || align=left | Disc.: CINEOS || 
|- id="2004 XX198" bgcolor=#d6d6d6
| 0 ||  || MBA-O || 16.17 || 3.2 km || multiple || 2004–2021 || 31 Oct 2021 || 83 || align=left | Disc.: Spacewatch || 
|- id="2004 XY198" bgcolor=#E9E9E9
| 0 ||  || MBA-M || 18.18 || data-sort-value="0.97" | 970 m || multiple || 2004–2022 || 07 Jan 2022 || 89 || align=left | Disc.: SpacewatchAdded on 22 July 2020 || 
|- id="2004 XZ198" bgcolor=#d6d6d6
| 0 ||  || MBA-O || 17.0 || 2.2 km || multiple || 2004–2020 || 10 Dec 2020 || 46 || align=left | Disc.: ZTFAdded on 22 July 2020 || 
|- id="2004 XA199" bgcolor=#fefefe
| 1 ||  || MBA-I || 18.7 || data-sort-value="0.54" | 540 m || multiple || 1995–2020 || 23 Jan 2020 || 23 || align=left | Disc.: Pan-STARRSAdded on 22 July 2020 || 
|- id="2004 XB199" bgcolor=#fefefe
| 1 ||  || MBA-I || 19.2 || data-sort-value="0.43" | 430 m || multiple || 1999–2020 || 23 May 2020 || 36 || align=left | Disc.: SpacewatchAdded on 22 July 2020 || 
|- id="2004 XC199" bgcolor=#E9E9E9
| 0 ||  || MBA-M || 17.62 || 1.3 km || multiple || 2003–2021 || 02 Dec 2021 || 111 || align=left | Disc.: MLSAdded on 13 September 2020 || 
|- id="2004 XD199" bgcolor=#d6d6d6
| 0 ||  || MBA-O || 16.81 || 2.4 km || multiple || 2004–2022 || 24 Jan 2022 || 86 || align=left | Disc.: SpacewatchAdded on 19 October 2020 || 
|- id="2004 XE199" bgcolor=#E9E9E9
| 3 ||  || MBA-M || 17.8 || data-sort-value="0.82" | 820 m || multiple || 2004–2020 || 12 Dec 2020 || 62 || align=left | Disc.: SpacewatchAdded on 19 October 2020 || 
|- id="2004 XF199" bgcolor=#d6d6d6
| 0 ||  || MBA-O || 17.1 || 2.1 km || multiple || 2004–2021 || 15 Feb 2021 || 72 || align=left | Disc.: SpacewatchAdded on 17 January 2021Alt.: 2010 DH18 || 
|- id="2004 XG199" bgcolor=#d6d6d6
| 0 ||  || MBA-O || 15.80 || 3.9 km || multiple || 2004–2022 || 10 Jan 2022 || 95 || align=left | Disc.: NEATAdded on 17 January 2021 || 
|- id="2004 XJ199" bgcolor=#fefefe
| 0 ||  || MBA-I || 18.90 || data-sort-value="0.49" | 490 m || multiple || 2002–2021 || 26 Nov 2021 || 55 || align=left | Disc.: SpacewatchAdded on 9 March 2021 || 
|- id="2004 XK199" bgcolor=#E9E9E9
| 1 ||  || MBA-M || 18.3 || 1.2 km || multiple || 1999–2014 || 07 Jan 2014 || 18 || align=left | Disc.: SpacewatchAdded on 9 March 2021 || 
|- id="2004 XL199" bgcolor=#fefefe
| 1 ||  || MBA-I || 18.7 || data-sort-value="0.54" | 540 m || multiple || 2004–2021 || 13 Apr 2021 || 32 || align=left | Disc.: Pan-STARRS 1Added on 17 June 2021 || 
|- id="2004 XN199" bgcolor=#d6d6d6
| 3 ||  || MBA-O || 17.62 || 1.7 km || multiple || 2004–2021 || 18 Jan 2021 || 24 || align=left | Disc.: Pan-STARRS 1Added on 21 August 2021 || 
|- id="2004 XO199" bgcolor=#E9E9E9
| 0 ||  || MBA-M || 18.0 || 1.4 km || multiple || 2004–2019 || 28 Jan 2019 || 33 || align=left | Disc.: MLSAdded on 21 August 2021 || 
|- id="2004 XQ199" bgcolor=#d6d6d6
| 0 ||  || MBA-O || 16.84 || 2.4 km || multiple || 2004–2022 || 27 Jan 2022 || 50 || align=left | Disc.: SpacewatchAdded on 5 November 2021 || 
|- id="2004 XR199" bgcolor=#E9E9E9
| 1 ||  || MBA-M || 18.0 || 1.1 km || multiple || 2004–2021 || 09 Nov 2021 || 37 || align=left | Disc.: MLSAdded on 24 December 2021 || 
|- id="2004 XS199" bgcolor=#E9E9E9
| 0 ||  || MBA-M || 18.22 || data-sort-value="0.95" | 950 m || multiple || 2004–2022 || 05 Jan 2022 || 47 || align=left | Disc.: SpacewatchAdded on 24 December 2021 || 
|- id="2004 XT199" bgcolor=#E9E9E9
| 0 ||  || MBA-M || 18.2 || data-sort-value="0.96" | 960 m || multiple || 2004–2021 || 30 Nov 2021 || 33 || align=left | Disc.: MLSAdded on 24 December 2021 || 
|- id="2004 XU199" bgcolor=#E9E9E9
| 0 ||  || MBA-M || 18.0 || 1.4 km || multiple || 1999–2021 || 04 Sep 2021 || 40 || align=left | Disc.: SpacewatchAdded on 24 December 2021 || 
|- id="2004 XV199" bgcolor=#E9E9E9
| 1 ||  || MBA-M || 18.29 || data-sort-value="0.92" | 920 m || multiple || 2004–2021 || 07 Aug 2021 || 22 || align=left | Disc.: MLSAdded on 29 January 2022 || 
|}
back to top

References 
 

Lists of unnumbered minor planets